The films listed below have been cited by a variety of notable critics in varying media sources as being among the worst films ever made. Examples of such sources include Metacritic, Roger Ebert's list of most-hated films, The Golden Turkey Awards, Leonard Maltin's Movie Guide, Rotten Tomatoes, pop culture writer Nathan Rabin's My World of Flops, the Stinkers Bad Movie Awards, the cult TV series Mystery Science Theater 3000 (alongside spinoffs Cinematic Titanic and RiffTrax) and the Golden Raspberry Awards (aka the "Razzies"). Films on these lists are generally feature-length films that are commercial/artistic in nature (intended to turn a profit, express personal statements or both), professionally or independently produced (as opposed to amateur productions), and released in theaters, then on television, or more recently through video on demand or streaming services.

1930s

Maniac (1934) 

  
Maniac, also known as Sex Maniac, is a Pre-Code exploitation-horror film directed by Dwain Esper. The story is a loose adaptation of the Edgar Allan Poe story "The Black Cat" and follows a vaudeville impersonator who becomes an assistant to a mad scientist. Promoted as a documentary on mental illness, Maniac was criticized for its gratuitous footage of women undressing and for taking horror sequences from the 1922 silent film Häxan. Danny Peary believes that Maniac is the worst film ever made, Charlie Jane Anders of Gawker Medias io9 described it as "possibly the worst movie in history" and Chicago Tribune critic Michael Wilmington wrote that it may be the worst film he had ever seen, writing: "There are some voyages into ineptitude, like Dwain Esper's anti-classic Maniac, that defy all reason." Rotten Tomatoes placed Maniac on its list of movies "So Bad They're Unmissable", Vanity Fair included the film on its list of the 20 worst movies ever and it is featured in John J. B. Wilson's book The Official Razzie Movie Guide: Enjoying the Best of Hollywood's Worst.

Reefer Madness (1936) 

Reefer Madness (originally released as Tell Your Children and sometimes titled or subtitled as The Burning Question, Dope Addict, Doped Youth, and Love Madness) is a 1936 American exploitation film and propaganda work revolving around the melodramatic events that ensue when high school students are lured by pushers to try marijuana— and become addicted and involved in various crimes such as a hit and run accident, manslaughter, murder, attempted rape, and descent into madness, association with organized crime and suicide.

Pacific Standard wrote that Reefer Madness was "one of the first films ever to be considered transcendentally bad" and Leonard Maltin has called it "the grand-daddy of all 'Worst' movies". Las Vegas CityLife named it the "worst ever" runner-up to Plan 9 from Outer Space, and News.com.au considered it a "disastrous flop turned cult classic" due to its "terrible acting and exaggerated drug-addicted stereotypes". Natalli Amato of The Daily Dot included Reefer Madness on her list of the best worst movies, writing that it "may be one of the worst movies of all time for the fact that it accomplished the exact opposite of its intended goal" by becoming a cult classic among stoners. Leaflys Danté Jordan also wrote that it may be "the worst movie of all time", criticizing its many inaccuracies regarding marijuana use and calling it "easily one of the most uncreative and tone-deaf pieces of anti-cannabis propaganda". For the Montreal Gazette, Joe Schwarz called it "undoubtedly one of the worst movies ever made", describing its acting as "stilted" and its plot as "seem[ing] comedic but...meant to be taken seriously".

The Terror of Tiny Town (1938) 

The Terror of Tiny Town, directed by Sam Newfield and produced by Jed Buell, remains the only musical Western with an all-dwarf cast. The film was pulled from obscurity as a camp classic after appearing in college and midnight screenings in the early 1970s. In 1978, it was included in Michael Medved's book, The Fifty Worst Films of All Time, and has since been listed as one of the worst films ever made, by Flavorwire, Rotten Tomatoes, and The Golden Turkey Awards. Melvin Defleur referred to it as "Perhaps the worst film of all time", and critic Gabriel Ricard listed it as the worst film ever made; stating, "not only is it pretty terrible, but Tiny Town is also pretty endearing." In 1986, The Terror of Tiny Town was the first film featured on Canned Film Festival, a late night television show featuring the worst movies ever made.

1940s

The Babe Ruth Story (1948) 

The Babe Ruth Story is a 1948 baseball film biography of Babe Ruth, starring William Bendix, Claire Trevor and Sam Levene. The New York Times describes it as "the Plan 9 from Outer Space of baseball biopics". It was rushed into release while Ruth was still alive. One infamous scene features Ruth promising a dying child that he will hit two home runs. The child is subsequently cured of his ailments after Ruth delivers on the promise.

Baseball Hall of Famer Ted Williams believed it to be the worst movie he had ever seen. The Washington Times stated that it "stands as possibly the worst movie ever made". The Spokesman-Review included the film on their list of the worst films of all time, while Paul Newberry of the Associated Press wrote that the film's place on "nearly every list of the worst movies ever made" was "with good reason". Newsdays Jack Mathews similarly wrote that The Babe Ruth Story was "what many people consider to be the worst sports movie of all time". It also was called one of the worst sports films ever each by Newsday and The A.V. Club, and called one of the worst biopics by Moviefone and Spike. Entertainment writer Michael Sauter included the film in his book, The Worst Movies of All Time, and Leonard Maltin called it "perfectly dreadful".

No Orchids for Miss Blandish (1948) 

No Orchids for Miss Blandish, a British gangster film adapted from the 1939 novel by James Hadley Chase, received a very hostile reception from the press. This was mainly due to the film's high (for the time) level of sexual and violent content, but also because its attempt to portray Americans using a largely British cast (including an early role for Sid James) was seen as unconvincing.

The British film journal Monthly Film Bulletin called it "the most sickening exhibition of brutality, perversion, sex and sadism ever to be shown on a cinema screen". The Sunday Express film reviewer called No Orchids for Miss Blandish "the worst film I have ever seen". The Australian newspaper The Age also gave a harsh review: "No Orchids for Miss Blandish is not only a disgrace to the studio that made it, but it also reflects on the British industry as a whole ... the entire production is unpardonable."

Cliff Goodwin, discussing No Orchids For Miss Blandish's initial reception, notes it was "unanimously dubbed 'the worst film ever made. Later reviews of the film were equally antipathetic. No Orchids for Miss Blandish was described by British film reviewer Leslie Halliwell as a "hilariously awful gangster film ... one of the worst films ever made". Leonard Maltin's Classic Movie Guide states that No Orchids for Miss Blandish "aspires to be a Hollywood film noir and misses by a mile."

1950s

Glen or Glenda (1953) 

Glen or Glenda starred Ed Wood as Glen, a transvestite who cross-dresses as Glenda. Wood also directed the film. After a dream sequence, Glen undergoes psychotherapy to help "cure" him of his transvestism.

Leonard Maltin wrote that Glen or Glenda was worse than Wood's later Plan 9 from Outer Space and considered it "possibly the worst movie ever made". Julien Allen of Reverse Shot similarly wrote that it was "widely considered to be an atrocity" and "the most catastrophic failure of [Wood's] singularly bad career". Richard Barrios described Glen or Glenda as "one of the funniest and worst movies ever made".

Robot Monster (1953) 

Robot Monster is a science-fiction film produced and directed by Phil Tucker and originally shot and exhibited in 3D. Its title character, which is "a man in a gorilla suit wearing what looks like a diving helmet sprouting TV antennae", was given the Most Ridiculous Monster in Screen History award in The Golden Turkey Awards. It is also featured in The Book of Lists 10 worst movies list, The Fifty Worst Films of All Time and Michael Sauter's book The Worst Movies of All Time. Robot Monster was featured in an episode of the movie-mocking television show Mystery Science Theater 3000, as well as Canned Film Festival. The film is remembered fondly by horror novelist Stephen King, who quotes, and agrees with, a review in Castle of Frankenstein magazine ("certainly among the finest terrible movies ever made", "one of the most laughable poverty row quickies"). Chris Barsanti in The Sci-Fi Movie Guide writes: "[Robot Monster] gives Plan 9 From Outer Space a run as the worst movie of all time."

The Conqueror (1956) 

Howard Hughes funded The Conqueror, an epic film featuring John Wayne as Mongolian chieftain Genghis Khan and the redheaded Susan Hayward as a Tatar princess. The movie was filmed near St. George, Utah, downwind from a nuclear testing range in Nevada, and is often blamed for the cancer deaths of many of the cast and crew, including Hayward, Wayne, Agnes Moorehead, Pedro Armendáriz, and director Dick Powell. In addition to filming near the testing range, truckloads of the red sands were transported back to the studios for interior scenes  and by 1980, 91 of the 220 (over 41%) cast and crew members had been diagnosed with cancer.

The film made the ten-worst list in The Book of Lists, appears in Michael Sauter's The Worst Movies of All Time, and was among those listed in The Fifty Worst Films of All Time. Additionally, the Aldergrove Star described The Conqueror as the worst ever made and Complex listed it as the worst biopic ever made. Originally written for Marlon Brando, The Guardian called the choice of Wayne for Khan "one of the worst casting decisions of all time". Wayne lamented taking the role, stating, "Don’t make an ass of yourself trying to play parts you are not suited for." The Daily Telegraph writes: "by absolutely every conceivable metric - financially, critically, historically, ethnically, and even body count – it would come to be known as one of the biggest disasters in cinematic history."

Hughes, one of the world's wealthiest people at the time, had previously produced the successful dramatic films Hell's Angels, Scarface, and The Outlaw. After seeing The Conqueror himself, Hughes bought every existing print for $12 million and refused to let the film be seen on television until 1974, reportedly out of guilt over the decision to shoot at such a hazardous location. This was the last film Hughes produced.

Fire Maidens from Outer Space (1956) 

Fire Maidens from Outer Space, a low-budget British space opera film (known in the US as Fire Maidens of Outer Space), is about a group of astronauts visiting an all-female society on a moon of Jupiter. This film developed a negative reputation for its poor special effects (including a scene on the alien planet in which an automobile is visible driving past). Leslie Halliwell described Fire Maidens from Outer Space as "a strong contender for the title of the worst movie ever made, with diaphanously clad English gals striking embarrassed poses against cardboard sets". British film historian I.Q. Hunter included it in his list of candidates for "the worst British film ever made". The DVD Talk website's review claimed it "may be among the worst-ever professionally produced science fiction films". Paul Welsh of the Borehamwood & Elstree Times wrote that it was "probably the worst [film] ever produced". In his book Operation Hollywood: How the Pentagon Shapes and Censors the Movies, David L. Robb wrote that the film's director Cy Roth is "widely regarded as one of the worst filmmakers of all time", adding that, out of the three films he made, "the worst was Fire Maidens from Outer Space...which is often cited as one of the ten worst movies ever made".

Plan 9 from Outer Space (1957) 

Ed Wood's Plan 9 from Outer Space, a science fiction film about aliens resurrecting the dead, was labeled the "Worst Film Ever" by The Golden Turkey Awards in 1980. Wood shot only a small amount of unrelated footage featuring top-billed star Bela Lugosi before his death. Wood incorporated the footage into the film and cast Tom Mason as Lugosi's stand-in; Mason, the chiropractor of Wood's wife, bore little resemblance to Lugosi and played his scenes holding the character's cape in front of his face. Although Golden Turkey Awards author Michael Medved credits Lugosi's top billing with its enduring legacy, The Independent listed various other shortcomings: "A UFO dangling in the sky has been variously said to be either a car hubcap or a paper plate. Actors read from scripts on their lap; sound microphones wobble in and out of shot. Fake trees and cemetery headstones wobble as the actors brush past them. Characters go into scenes when it's night time and leave five minutes later into daylight. ... the plot itself appears to be the product of insanity."

Emanuel Levy notes the film has been dubbed "the epitome of so-bad-it’s-good cinema" and has gained a cult following since appearing in The Golden Turkey Awards. My Year of Flops author Nathan Rabin wrote that: "It’s hard to overstate the role Plan 9 From Outer Space and its eccentric creator have played in the birth and evolution of bad movie culture... Plan 9 was the original best worst movie." BBC writer Nicholas Barber wrote that "it stands as the epitome of cinematic awfulness. And that's why so many people love it." Glenn Kenny of RogerEbert.com and The Radio Times Guide to Films each described it as the worst movie ever made, and IGN wrote: "Plan 9 From Outer Space was the undisputed best worst movie ever made for decades until films like Troll 2 and The Room got notorious, and it’s still a legitimate contender".

It holds a 66% rating on Rotten Tomatoes based on 38 reviews, with the consensus stating that it is "justly celebrated for its staggering ineptitude". Phil Hall of Film Threat contends that the film is "far too entertaining to be considered as the very worst film ever made", and Kim Newman states that, "The worst thing you can say about a film is that it's boring, and Plan 9 is a fairly entertaining movie." Although Flavorwire included it on its list of the 50 worst movies ever made (in the 50th spot), writer Jason Bailey described The Golden Turkey Awardss assessment of it as "a label that stuck" and opined that he did not think it was even Wood's worst film. Likewise, John Wirt of The Advocate goes as far as to call it "the ultimate cult flick", and Videohound's Complete Guide to Cult Flicks and Trash Pics states, "In fact, the film has become so famous for its own badness that it's now beyond criticism." Barber credits Plan 9s cult following to the film having some "halfway decent" elements, such as the film's title and screen presence of actors Tor Johnson and Maila Nurmi, while film historian Rodney F. Hill considers the film to be a "campy, cult masterpiece" with a "minimalist avant-garde aesthetic".

1960s

The Creeping Terror (1964) 

The science-fiction/horror film The Creeping Terror was directed, produced, and edited by Vic Savage (under the pseudonym A.J. Nelson or Arthur Nelson, but kept his name when credited as an actor). The movie is about a large slug-like alien that lands on Earth and terrorizes a small town in California. The film is memorable for its use of some bargain-basement effects: stock footage of a rocket launch played in reverse to depict the landing of an alien spacecraft, and the "monster" appears to be composed of a length of shag carpet draped over several actors. Notably, the creature's victims inexplicably stand perfectly still as the slow-moving monster approaches them.

ComingSoon.net declared it "widely considered the worst picture ever made", calling Plan 9 From Outer Space "a bona fide magnum opus" compared to The Creeping Terror. Montreal Gazette and Dread Central also report that it has a reputation as being one of the worst films ever made. The film was featured in The Golden Turkey Awards, and its follow-up book, Son of Golden Turkey Awards. Mystery Science Theater 3000 featured The Creeping Terror during their sixth season and British film magazine Total Film included it on their list of the 66 worst films ever made.

A documentary directed by Pete Schuermann about the making of the film, The Creep Behind The Camera, was released in 2014.

Santa Claus Conquers the Martians (1964) 

The sci-fi movie Santa Claus Conquers the Martians was the creation of television director Nicholas Webster. Because Martian children only get to see Santa Claus on TV signals beamed from Earth, their parents decide to abduct Santa to make them happy. The film was criticized for its oddity and poor special effects. It is also known for starring a very young Pia Zadora. BBC critic Nick Cramp described it as "possibly the worst film ever made". The film is cited on a 10-worst list in The Book of Lists and in The Fifty Worst Films of All Time. It has been featured in Mystery Science Theater 3000, Canned Film Festival, Rifftrax and Cinematic Titanic (another spin-off of MST3K that revisited the film in 2008).

The Incredibly Strange Creatures Who Stopped Living and Became Mixed-Up Zombies (1964) 

The Incredibly Strange Creatures Who Stopped Living and Became Mixed-Up Zombies (sometimes billed as The Incredibly Strange Creatures) is a 1964 American monster movie written and directed by Ray Dennis Steckler. Steckler also starred in the film, billed under the pseudonym "Cash Flagg". In the film, three friends visit a carnival and stumble onto a group of occultists and disfigured monsters. Produced on a $38,000 budget, much of it takes place at The Pike amusement park in Long Beach, California, which resembles Brooklyn's Coney Island. The film was billed as the first "monster musical", beating out The Horror of Party Beach by a mere month in release date. The music critic Lester Bangs wrote an appreciative 1973 essay about Incredibly Strange Creatures in which he tries to explain and justify the movie's value: "This flick doesn't just rebel against, or even disregard, standards of taste and art. In the universe inhabited by The Incredibly Strange Creatures Who Stopped Living and Became Mixed-Up Zombies, such things as standards and responsibility have never been heard of. It is this lunar purity which largely imparts to the film its classic stature. Like Beyond the Valley of the Dolls and a very few others, it will remain as an artifact in years to come to which scholars and searchers for truth can turn and say, This was trash!

Monster a Go-Go! (1965) 

Monster a Go-Go! began as Terror at Halfday by Bill Rebane. The production ran out of money and the film was abandoned. Herschell Gordon Lewis, who reportedly needed a second feature to comprise a double bill, purchased and completed it for a minimal amount of money. Several of the film's actors were unable to return, so Lewis simply replaced their parts with new characters who mysteriously appear and fill the roles of the missing characters. One of the actors Lewis managed to rehire had gained weight, gone bald, and grown a goatee, so Lewis recast him as the brother of the original character. The picture consists mostly of lengthy dialogue sequences concerning the apparent mutation of an astronaut into a monster portrayed by the 231 cm (7 ft 6¾ in) tall Henry Hite. Poor audio quality makes much of the dialogue unintelligible, and when the film is overexposed, several characters' faces appear as bright white, glowing circles. During the climax of the movie, as soldiers prepare to confront the mutated astronaut, he abruptly vanishes and the narrator informs the audience, "there was no monster", and that the astronaut has, in fact, been in the Atlantic Ocean the entire time. All Movie Guide calls the film a "surreal anti-masterpiece". It was also featured on Mystery Science Theater 3000, where writer Paul Chaplin called the dialogue "garbled beyond recognition". The entire cast of the show later stated it was officially the worst movie they had ever seen.

Manos: The Hands of Fate (1966) 

The low-budget horror film Manos: The Hands of Fate, made by El Paso insurance and fertilizer salesman Hal P. Warren, concerns a vacationing family kidnapped by a polygamous cult of pagans. The film was conceived after Warren bet Academy Award-winning screenwriter Stirling Silliphant that anyone could make a horror movie. Warren was convinced by the film's cinematographer and stunt coordinator that most of its glaring mistakes could be fixed in a Dallas post-production studio, when in reality the two wanted to quickly wrap the production because they were not being paid. Several technical gaffes made it into the film, including scenes filmed out of focus, a marking slate being seen in one shot, the scarf on the female lead's head disappearing and reappearing, and an insect bumping the camera lens. The film was shot with a camera that could not record sound and had a 32-second maximum shot length. All dialogue was later dubbed by Warren and four others, including a grown woman who dubbed the voice for a seven-year-old girl. It opens with a nine-minute driving scene that the filmmakers intended to use for cast and crew credits, but failed to do so.

The movie includes dialogue spoken while all characters are facing away from the camera, a character complaining about it getting dark while the sun is brightly shining, and the character Torgo, a satyr with overly large thighs, that three women attempt to massage to death. The film gained notoriety and cult popularity by being featured on Mystery Science Theater 3000, and was the show's most popular episode. The film has a rare 0% approval rating on Rotten Tomatoes, and Entertainment Weekly says the movie is "widely regarded as, quite simply, the worst movie ever made". Even Warren himself would later admit his film was one of the worst ever, suggesting it might make a passable comedy if redubbed. The film was later restored and released on Blu-ray in 2015.

A Place for Lovers (1968) 

A Place for Lovers is a French-Italian romantic film directed by Vittorio De Sica (a filmmaker known for acclaimed neorealist works such as Umberto D and The Bicycle Thieves), starring Faye Dunaway as a terminally ill American fashion designer in Venice, Italy, and Marcello Mastroianni as a race car driver who has a whirlwind affair with her. Roger Ebert of the Chicago Sun-Times called it the "most godawful piece of pseudo-romantic slop I've ever seen!" and Charles Champlin of the Los Angeles Times referred to it as "the worst movie I have seen all year and possibly since 1926". Leonard Maltin noted Ebert's comments in his review and offered that the film was "low points for all concerned". A Place for Lovers was included as one of the choices in The Fifty Worst Films of All Time and Vanity Fair listed it as one of the 20 worst movies ever made.

They Saved Hitler's Brain (1968) 

They Saved Hitler's Brain is a science fiction film directed by David Bradley. It was adapted for television from a shorter 1963 theatrical feature film, Madmen of Mandoras, and was lengthened by about 20 minutes with additional footage shot by UCLA students at the request of the distributor. In the film, Adolf Hitler's head was severed from his body at the end of World War II and the head plans to rule over a new Third Reich from South America. It has a 0% rating on Rotten Tomatoes, based on five reviews from critics, with an average rating of 1.3/10. TV Guide called it "One of the all-time worst", while Danny Peary said it was "A legitimate candidate for Worst Film Ever Made title." In 1979, it won the World's Worst Film Festival in Ottawa, Canada, which reportedly delighted Bradley. It has been featured in The Golden Turkey Awards and Canned Film Festival, and has been spoofed on The Simpsons multiple times.

1970s

Bat Pussy (early 1970s) 

The anonymous pornographic film Bat Pussy, created sometime in the early 1970s before being rediscovered in 1996, is considered by critics to be the "worst pornographic film ever made". It stars unidentified actors, and follows "Bat Pussy", a parody of Batman, bouncing around a park on a space hopper before interrupting the sex of a couple named Buddy and Sam. The film has achieved a cult following.

Myra Breckinridge (1970) 

The 1970 comedy film Myra Breckinridge, based on the book of the same name by Gore Vidal, directed by Michael Sarne and starring Raquel Welch, Rex Reed, Mae West, John Huston and Farrah Fawcett, provoked controversy due to a scene in which Welch forcibly sodomizes a bound man while clips from various classic films play onscreen. The film was initially rated X before edits and an appeal to the MPAA brought it down to an R. It also used the technique of inserting clips from Golden Age movies in such a way that the dialogue took on sexual undertones. Several stars whose films were featured objected to the gimmick such as Loretta Young who sued to remove the footage from the 1939 film The Story of Alexander Graham Bell. The film was a critical failure, with Time magazine saying, "Myra Breckinridge is about as funny as a child molester." Leonard Maltin gave it a BOMB (the lowest score possible) and stated that it was "as bad as any movie ever made". The Miami News critic Herb Kelly nominated Myra Breckinridge as the worst film ever made. It was also included in The Book of Lists worst movies of all time, which claimed that there was something in it to offend absolutely everyone. Likewise, The Fifty Worst Films of All Time and Vanity Fair also listed it as one of the worst movies ever made. Gore Vidal disowned it, calling it "an awful joke", and blamed the movie for a decade-long drought in the sale of the original book.

Zaat (1971) 

Directed by Don Barton, Zaat was also known under various titles including Hydra, Attack of the Swamp Creatures, Legend of the Zaat Monster, and The Blood Waters of Dr. Z (the name under which it was lampooned on Mystery Science Theater 3000). The film follows a Nazi mad scientist who injects himself with a formula that turns him into a mutated catfish. Florida Times-Union critic Matt Soergel quipped that Zaat "could very well be the best film ever made about a mutated catfish". Critic Jeffrey Kauffman said, "this is the sort of film Ed Wood, Jr. might have made—on a bad day" and added, "Lovers of fantastically bad films rate Zaat one of the worst". Patrick Naugle of DVD Verdict stated, "The acting in Zaat is below subpar. Actors seem to be whispering their lines and trying hard not to fully comprehend that they're in one of the worst films ever made", while Michael Rubino of DVD Verdict also claimed, "Zaat may be one of the worst films ever created". NPR called it a "sci-fi fiasco" when it became "the winner — er, loser —" on IMDb's Bottom 100. Zaat appeared on Mystery Science Theater 3000, which gave it significant exposure, and was also featured on RedLetterMedia's show Half in the Bag where the hosts called it one of their favorite "so bad it's good" films. Total Film included it in their list of the 66 worst films of all time.

An American Hippie in Israel (1972) 

The 1972 Israeli film An American Hippie in Israel is about an American hippie traveling to Israel after being involved with the Vietnam War, befriending Israeli flower children, and encountering "menacing" mimes along the way. The film was presumed lost, but after resurfacing 38 years after its production, it became a "midnight sensation" in Tel Aviv and developed a cult following akin to The Rocky Horror Picture Show. It was then released internationally on home video by Grindhouse Releasing. Gil Shefler of The Jewish Daily Forward described it as "perfectly awful", offering that it "probably is the worst Israeli movie ever made, and a serious candidate for the worst movie of all time". Its description as "a serious candidate for the worst movie of all time" was echoed by Josh Olson in IndieWire. Ben Hartman of The Jerusalem Post stated the film was "surely one of the worst films ever made in Israel, or beyond". Nana 10 said it claims the title of "worst Israeli film and most amusing".

At Long Last Love (theatrical version, 1975) 

At Long Last Love was renowned director Peter Bogdanovich's musical homage to great 1930s Hollywood musicals. It features songs by Cole Porter and stars Cybill Shepherd and Burt Reynolds. Film Threat wrote that it received "the most withering reviews any film ever received", while The Guardian reported that it was "savaged by critics at the time and viewed as one of the worst films ever". Richard Brody of The New Yorker compared it to the later critical failures of Heaven's Gate and Ishtar, writing: "critics of the time heaven’s-gated [At Long Last Love], leaving Bogdanovich ishtarred and feathered". Such reviews included Hollis Alpert's, in which he said that "This failure is so dismal that it goes beyond failure", and Esquire critic John Simon's, who said that "it may be the worst movie musical of this – or any – decade". Meanwhile, Buffalo News film critic Jeff Simon wrote, "About 45 minutes in, it became apparent to one and all that this was one of the worst and most embarrassing major-talent turkeys of all time." Bogdanovich, who was also the screenwriter, sent press releases to newspapers across the country apologizing for this film.

CNN later noted that it had attained a legacy as being "the worst musical extravaganza in Hollywood history", and Jay Cocks has said the film was "regarded as the great white elephant catastrophe of its time". Lester J. Keyser wrote that it was "justly included on most lists of the ten worst films ever made", as it was included in Michael Sauter's The Worst Films of All Time, The Golden Turkey Awards and Vanity Fair'''s worst film list.

Bogdanovich lamented being influenced by studio previews to cut the film before its theatrical release. Unbeknownst to Bogdanovich, a studio editor who preferred the director's first cut constructed his own based on the test screening version that he once had access to. This version subsequently aired on cable television and streamed on Netflix in place of the theatrical cut. When news of this reached Bogdanovich, he contacted Fox and made a few finishing touches, resulting in a better received director's cut that debuted on home video in 2013.

 Exorcist II: The Heretic (1977) Exorcist II: The Heretic is the sequel to William Friedkin's Oscar-winning 1973 film, this time directed by John Boorman. While British film critic Mark Kermode called the original film his favourite film of all time, he believes the sequel to be the worst film ever made. The Golden Turkey Awards named it the second-worst film ever made, after Plan 9 from Outer Space. Critic Bill Chambers stated it was "Possibly the worst film ever made and surely the worst sequel ever made." It also appeared in The Official Razzie Movie Guide book. Friedkin believes the sequel diminished the value of the original film and called it "the worst piece of shit I've ever seen" and "a fucking disgrace." Eventually, the film garnered so much hate that Boorman disowned it. In an interview with Bob McCabe for the book The Exorcist: Out of the Shadows, he confessed, "The sin I committed was not giving the audience what it wanted in terms of horror."

 The Swarm (1978) The Swarm is a 1978 horror film about a killer bee invasion of Texas, directed and produced by Irwin Allen. Despite its all-star cast (including Michael Caine, Henry Fonda, Richard Widmark and Olivia de Havilland), it was a box-office failure and was excoriated by reviewers. On its UK release, The Sunday Times described The Swarm as "simply the worst film ever made". Leslie Halliwell described it as a "very obvious disaster movie with risible dialogue". The Guardian article on The Swarm stated, "You could pass it all off as a sick joke, except it cost twelve million dollars, twenty-two million bees, and several years of someone's life." Barry Took, reviewing it for Punch, stated, "the story is of a banality matched only by the woodenness of the acting". Time Out magazine called The Swarm a "risibly inadequate disaster movie". The Swarm is included in several "worst movie" books, including the Medved brothers' The Golden Turkey Awards, and The Official Razzie Movie Guide. It soon gained a cult status (enough so that Warner Archive released the extended version on Blu-ray).

 I Spit on Your Grave (1978) I Spit on Your Grave became controversial for its graphic violence and lengthy depictions of gang rape. It was initially unable to find a distributor until 1980, when it received a wider release. Luke Y. Thompson of the New Times stated, "Defenders of the film have argued that it's actually pro-woman, due to the fact that the female lead wins in the end, which is sort of like saying that cockfights are pro-rooster because there's always one left standing". Critic David Keyes named I Spit on Your Grave the worst film of the 1980s and James Livingston wrote in The World Turned Inside Out that it was "a terrifically bad movie". Scott Tobias of The A.V. Club called it "one of the era's most abhorrent pieces of exploitation trash" and Patrick Naugle of DVD Verdict stated, "It's one of the most soulless, vile, and morally reprehensible things I've ever had to sit through." Roger Ebert gave the film no stars, referring to it as "A vile bag of garbage ... without a shred of artistic distinction," adding, "Attending it was one of the most depressing experiences of my life" and considered it the worst movie ever made. Gene Siskel also considered it one of the worst films ever made. Film Racket featured it as their first entry in to their "Worst Movie Ever?" series, while Vanity Fair and Flavorwire included it in their worst film lists. Despite the intense negative reception from some critics, the film has a 53% rating on Rotten Tomatoes, with IGN critic R.L. Shaffer arguing that whether the film is repulsive and exploitative or ingenious depends on what the viewer wants from the movie: "Admittedly, I Spit on Your Grave is a gruesome, deplorable little exploitation picture that, on the surface, seems to enjoy its rape sequences just as much, if not more, than the vengeance-filled finale. But on a more subtle level, the film is a surprisingly well-executed revenge story that plays like a brutally raw nerve – a terrifyingly stark view of the real horror of rape, painted by bizarre, skewed cinematography, gory violence, and a keen sense of creeping atmosphere and dread."

 Caligula (1979) 

The 1979 erotic/historical drama Caligula, directed by Tinto Brass about the infamous Roman Emperor Caligula, was in part financed by Penthouse founder Bob Guccione. The film, featuring a prestigious cast (Malcolm McDowell, Helen Mirren, Peter O'Toole, and John Gielgud) has explicit scenes of sex and violence, including six minutes of hardcore porn footage filmed by Guccione and another editor. Caligula earned some prerelease controversy after Gore Vidal, who had written the script, distanced himself from the film, and actress Maria Schneider, who objected to the nude scenes, walked off the set and was replaced with then-unknown Teresa Ann Savoy. Upon its release, Vidal stated that it was "easily one of the worst films ever made".Caligula also received strongly hostile reviews from critics, who denounced its extreme scenes of sex and violence and lack of narrative coherence. Roger Ebert gave Caligula a zero stars rating, dubbing it "sickening, utterly worthless, shameful trash", accusing it of being artistically vulgar in its depiction of sex and violence, and of having technically incompetent direction and structure. It was one of the few films Ebert ever walked out on (two hours into its 170-minute running time), after describing himself as feeling "disgusted and unspeakably depressed". Ebert also placed it on his "Most Hated" list and Michael Sauter selected it for The Worst Movies of All Time. Australian newspaper The Age stated that Caligula was being "billed by critics everywhere as one of the worst films ever made". The Hamilton Spectator later referred to Caligula as "possibly the worst movie ever made". Joe Holleman, in an article in the St. Louis Post-Dispatch discussing historical films set in Ancient Rome, argued, "two of the worst movies made in the 20th century were ancient Rome pieces ... Cleopatra and Caligula". Christopher Armstead, reviewing Caligula for the website Film Critics United, stated, "Dollar for dollar, this could very well be the worst movie ever made." In 2011, Sean Bell of PopMatters wrote of its enduring legacy: "in the same way much of our attention-deficit civilisation may go through life vaguely aware that Citizen Kane is a masterpiece without ever seeing it, ... we know that Caligula is awful, usually without ever finding out for ourselves."

 1980s 

 Heaven's Gate (theatrical version, 1980) 

The Western epic Heaven's Gate, loosely based on the Johnson County War in 1890s Wyoming, was plagued by massive cost and time overruns, largely due to director Michael Cimino's extreme attention to detail. He demanded 50 takes of at least one scene and refused to start shooting for another until a cloud he liked rolled across the sky. It cost over $44 million, but brought in only $3.5 million at the box office. The original version ran at nearly four hours, but was yanked from release after only one week due to scathing reviews. It later resurfaced in a 149-minute version, but by then the damage was done. Vincent Canby called it "an unqualified disaster", among other things. Roger Ebert called it "the most scandalous cinematic waste I've ever seen".

After word of his grandiose spending and defiant nature toward studio United Artists got out (detailed in Final Cut by Steven Bach, a studio executive involved with the film from the beginning), Cimino was awarded the 1980 Golden Raspberry Award for Worst Director, and the film was nominated for four more Razzies, including Worst Picture. In 1999, Time placed the film on a list of the 100 worst ideas of the 20th century. In 2008, Joe Queenan of The Guardian called it the worst film ever made, saying that it "defies belief". Readers of film magazine Empire later voted Heaven's Gate the sixth-worst film of all time, and Vanity Fair included it in its list of the worst films ever made. Cimino was initially considered a director on the rise after directing The Deer Hunter (which won five Oscars, including Best Picture and Best Director), but his reputation never recovered after Heaven's Gate. The production is also notorious for the cruelty to animals that occurred both on screen and on site, including deliberately killing a horse with explosives. The film effectively ended not only the existence of United Artists as an independent Hollywood studio (its parent firm sold the company to Metro-Goldwyn-Mayer, where it still operates), but also, largely, Cimino's career; he would not direct again until 1985's Year of the Dragon.

Despite the vicious reviews, the film's reputation improved over time. In fall 2012, the New York Film Festival, the venue for its infamous opening, premiered the restored director's cut. In stark contrast, The Times (London) called the restored version "a modern masterpiece" and its 1980 cut "one of the greatest injustices of cinematic history". The film has also been released on Blu-ray and DVD by the Criterion Collection. Manohla Dargis of The New York Times said that the film "has been called a disaster and a disgrace, yet also anointed a masterpiece."

 The Apple (1980) The Apple (also called Star Rock) is a 1980 science fiction musical comedy film written and directed by Menahem Golan. It stars Catherine Mary Stewart as a young singer named Bibi, who, in a futuristic 1994, signs to an evil label named Boogalow International Music. It deals with themes of conformity versus rebellion, and makes use of Biblical allegory, including that of Adam and Eve and the rapture.

Common criticism from both reviews that appeared in trade publications and major news outlets and the audience were a lack of originality, a weak script, uninspired music, poor execution, and Golan's inexperienced take on the 1960s hippie movement. During the 1980 Montreal World Film Festival, some members of the audience threw vinyl records of music from the film at the screen. At the 1980 Stinkers Bad Movie Awards, the film received seven nominations (including Worst Picture) and won two awards: Worst Director (Golan) and Least "Special" Special Effects. Stinkers co-founder Mike Lancaster later selected The Apple as the worst film he had ever seen. The Saturday Evening Post listed it as the worst movie musical ever, and critic Tim Brayton described it as "A completely unadulterated bundle of the worst of cinema all spun up into one ball of madness. It cannot be described, and it can barely be experienced." Sean Burns in Philadelphia Weekly wrote: "The Apple isn't just the worst disco musical ever made; it could very well be the worst movie ever made, period." The Apple was included in Pastes Bad Movie Diaries column, where critic Kenneth Lowe described it as "without a doubt the most cringe-inducing, the most mortifying, the absolutely most embarrassing feature we’ve ever watched." It has also been covered by the How Did This Get Made? podcast and Flavorwires Bad Movie Night column and Mental Floss listed it as one of the "Ten Really Bad Movies that Define 'Bad Movies'".

 Inchon (1981)  

The war film Inchon, directed by Terence Young and starring Laurence Olivier as General Douglas MacArthur, was meant to depict the Battle of Inchon during the Korean War. Producer Mitsuharu Ishii was a senior member of the Japanese branch of the Unification Church, whose leader, Sun Myung Moon, claimed he had the film made to show MacArthur's spirituality and connection to God and the Japanese people. Its eventual production cost of $46 million resulted in a $5 million box-office gross, and The New York Times review written by Vincent Canby calls the movie "the most expensive B-movie ever". The Washington Post described Inchon as "one of the biggest commercial disasters in film history". Every conceivable kind of problem plagued production, including labor issues, the U.S. military withdrawing support due to the film's Unification Church connection, weather and natural disasters, customs difficulties, expensive directorial blunders, and the original director (Andrew McLaglen) quitting before the start of production. Olivier's performance was criticised, and he was awarded the 1982 Golden Raspberry award for Worst Actor. The film itself took the 1982 Razzies for Worst Picture and Worst Screenplay, and Young's direction earned him a tie for Worst Director of 1982. A number of reviewers at various media outlets described Inchon as the worst film ever made, including The Washington Post, Newsweek, TV Guide, and the Canadian Press. Inchon was later profiled in multiple books on worst in film, including The Hollywood Hall of Shame by Harry and Michael Medved, and The Worst Movies of All Time by Michael Sauter. To date, Inchon has never been released on home video in the United States although it was aired on the church's Good Life TV Network.

 Tarzan, the Ape Man (1981) 

The adventure film Tarzan, the Ape Man, loosely based on the novel Tarzan of the Apes by Edgar Rice Burroughs, stars Miles O'Keeffe (who would later become famous in the 1984 Conan the Barbarian knock-off Ator the Invincible alongside its sequel featured in two episodes of the TV series Mystery Science Theater 3000) in the title role and Bo Derek as his partner Jane Parker, and is told from Jane's point of view. Despite being a box-office success, it was poorly received by critics upon its release, due to its poor screenplay, bad acting, and unintentional humor. Leonard Maltin, writing for his Movie Guide, stated that the film "lacks action, humor and charm", and considered it so bad that it "nearly forced editors of this book to devise a rating lower than BOMB". Leslie Halliwell was equally harsh; he described Tarzan, the Ape Man as "certainly the worst of the Tarzan movies and possibly the most banal film so far made; even the animals give poor performances". Writer Thomas S. Hischak described it thus: "Produced and directed without a shred of talent by John Derek, Tarzan, the Ape Man often ranks high in the lists of the worst movies ever made." Film critic John Nesbit considered it "my pick for worst film ever", while Matt Brunson of Creative Loafing wrote, "this cinematic atrocity truly is one of the all-time worsts". Tarzan, the Ape Man was nominated for six awards at the 2nd Golden Raspberry Awards, winning one for Worst Actress (Bo Derek). It holds a 10% rating on Rotten Tomatoes based on 20 reviews.

 Mommie Dearest (1981) Mommie Dearest, directed by Frank Perry, was based on the memoir of the same name by Christina Crawford about her upbringing by Joan Crawford. It was the first film to sweep the Golden Raspberry Awards nominations, winning a total of five Razzies out of the nine nominations, including "Worst Picture" and Worst Actress (Faye Dunaway, shared with Bo Derek). The same organization also named it "Worst Picture of the Decade" in 1989/90, and was nominated for "Worst Drama of Our First 25 Years" in 2004/05. The film is part of the "100 most awful" in The Official Razzie Movie Guide and Michael Sauter's The Worst Movies of All Time. It earned, as film critic and television host Richard Crouse put it, "some of the nastiest reviews ever". Eric Henderson of CBS Minneapolis named it at the top of his "Best 'Worst Movies Ever list. Roger Ebert wrote of this film, "I can't imagine who would want to subject themselves to this movie. 'Mommie Dearest' is a painful experience that drones on endlessly, as Joan Crawford's relationship with her daughter, Christina, disintegrates from cruelty through jealousy into pathos." Of the performance of Faye Dunaway, Variety said "Dunaway does not chew scenery. Dunaway starts neatly at each corner of the set in every scene and swallows it whole, co-stars and all." Vanity Fair and Rotten Tomatoes subsequently included Mommie Dearest on their worst film lists.

Despite the reviews at the time, the film was a box-office success, grossing $39 million worldwide on a $5 million budget. It has a 50% approval rating on Rotten Tomatoes based on 46 reviews. The site's consensus reads, "Mommie Dearest certainly doesn't lack for conviction, and neither does Faye Dunaway's legendary performance as a wire-wielding monster; unfortunately, the movie is too campy and undisciplined to transcend guilty pleasure".

 Dünyayı Kurtaran Adam (The Man Who Saved the World) (1982) 

The Turkish science-fiction adventure Dünyayı Kurtaran Adam (also commonly known as Turkish Star Wars) was directed by Çetin İnanç and starred Cüneyt Arkın. It is notorious for illegally using footage from well-known science fiction films and shows, most notably Star Wars, along with stealing the music score from films such as Moonraker and Raiders of the Lost Ark. The film is also criticized for its nonsensical plot, badly written dialogue, and crude special effects. It is also a fantasy martial arts film, heavily influenced by 1970s Hong Kong martial arts films from Golden Harvest.

Jos Kirps of ArticlesBase called it "The Worst Movie Ever", and stated, "There are many bad sci-fi movies, and for many years movie addicts even considered Ed Wood's Plan 9 From Outer Space the worst movie of all times. But Plan 9 is still a pretty good movie when compared to Dünyayi Kurtaran Adam." Sabah called it the "world's worst film". Hürriyet described the film as "sitting on the throne of the king" when compared to other "so bad it's good" cult films. Toronto Standard called it a "dollar-store Star Wars" and compared it to the works of Ed Wood. When it became apparent that the film had inspired an enthusiastic international cult, a sequel, The Son of the Man Who Saved the World (Dünyayı Kurtaran Adam'ın Oğlu), was shot in 2006 and featured many returning members of the original cast and crew.

 Howard the Duck (1986) 

Produced by George Lucas and based on the Marvel Comics character of the same name, Howard the Duck received overwhelmingly negative reviews from film critics. Orange Coast Magazine writer Marc Weinberg and Leonard Maltin criticized the decision to shoot the film in live action. The appearance of Howard was criticized as being unconvincing due to his poorly functioning mouth and expressionless face. Reviewers also criticized the acting and humor and found the film boring. Dave Kehr of the Chicago Tribune said the movie's "crude, often embarrassing, sex jokes" seemed "out of place" with the more innocent aspects of the film. Jay Carr of The Boston Globe claimed that "They Don't Get Much Worse Than Howard, Glenn Heath Jr. of Slant Magazine wrote that it "has a rightful place in the canon of worst films ever", and TV Guide states it is "one of the worst big-budget movies ever made".

Rotten Tomatoes gives the film a score of 15% based on 48 reviews, making it the lowest-rated Lucasfilm production of those reviewed on the site. The site's consensus states: "While it has its moments, Howard the Duck suffers from an uneven tone and mediocre performances." It received seven Golden Raspberry Award nominations in 1987 including Worst Supporting Actor (Tim Robbins), Worst Director (Willard Huyck) and Worst Original Song ("Howard the Duck"). It won four trophies for Worst Screenplay, Worst New Star ("the six guys and gals in the duck suit"), Worst Visual Effects, and Worst Picture, tied with Under the Cherry Moon. The movie also won a Stinkers Bad Movie Awards for Worst Picture.

It was featured in Empires poll of the 50 worst films ever made, and Screen Rant and Vanity Fair have included it on their worst film lists. The negative reaction to the film took its toll on the cast, who found themselves unable to work on other projects as a result.

Over time, the film has remained a source of fascination and developed "a small, but loyal fanbase." Howard the Duck has appeared in several Marvel Cinematic Universe movies and series beginning in 2014's Guardians of the Galaxy, in which he was voiced by Seth Green.

 Ishtar (1987) Ishtar was written and directed by Elaine May and starred Oscar-winning duo Warren Beatty and Dustin Hoffman as an ode to the Road to... film series featuring Bing Crosby and Bob Hope. Beatty and Hoffman star as Rogers and Clarke, two untalented lounge singers who travel to Morocco in hopes of finding a gig. Due to unanticipated problems with filming in the desert—which resulted in numerous reshoots—the film ran over budget by $30 million. While its final budget cost was $55 million, Ishtar earned only $14,375,181 at the North American box office, leading Ishtar to become synonymous with "box-office flop". It was also subject to harsh reviews from critics. The film was nominated for Worst Picture and Worst Screenplay in the 8th Golden Raspberry Awards, winning one for Worst Director. The San Jose Mercury News claimed that "Time has not improved this film's reputation as being one of the worst ever made." Time Out suggested it was "so bad it could have been deliberate", and called it "one of the worst films ever made", while Ed Morrissey referred to it as "The Citizen Kane of big-budget, A-list vehicular homicides." It was included in Michael Sauter's The Worst Movies of All Time book, Rotten Tomatoes placed it amongst "25 Moves So Bad They're Unmissable" and Richard Roeper included it on his list of the 40 worst films he had seen. In 1999, Time placed the film on a list of the 100 worst ideas of the 20th century.

The film has since become a cult classic. Ishtar has seen a minor critical re-evaluation from some critics like Richard Brody, and directors Quentin Tarantino, Edgar Wright, and Martin Scorsese have praised it in interviews. Gary Larson, who initially lampooned the movie in The Far Side, said he regrets writing that cartoon because he based it solely off of Ishtars reputation, and that he enjoyed it when he later watched it. To date it is the only cartoon he has publicly admitted to regreting.  Defenders argue that the studio did not back May, resulting in a public relations disaster before it was released in theaters. Joe Queenan compared the film to another comedy film considered the worst, Gigli, and wrote that although it was considered one of the worst films ever made at the time of its release, it "has several comic moments" and does not get worse on subsequent viewings, unlike Gigli.

 Leonard Part 6 (1987) 

Leonard Part 6, starring (as well as written and produced by) Bill Cosby, was intended as a parody of spy movies. Leonard Parker, a former CIA spy, is brought out of retirement to save the world from an evil vegetarian who brainwashes animals to kill people. Rita Kempley at The Washington Post noted the large number of Coca-Cola product placements and said "The only good thing about Bill Cosby's Leonard Part 6 is that we didn't have to see Parts 1 through 5." Scott Weinberg at DVD Talk noted the film as "truly one of the worst movies you'll ever see ... movies this bad should be handled with Teflon gloves and a pair of tongs". By 1990, Dennis King of the Tulsa World wrote that the film had "become synonymous with 'bomb.'" Total Film and Vanity Fair subsequently included Leonard Part 6 on their respective worst film lists. Cosby himself disowned the film, and when it was released to theaters he publicly advised people not to see it. It earned Golden Raspberrys for Worst Actor (Cosby), Worst Picture, and Worst Screenplay. It was also nominated for two more Razzie Awards, for Worst Supporting Actress and Worst Director. Cosby became the first person to accept a Golden Raspberry Award, and said "It was the worst movie I ever made - the worst movie anyone ever made".

 Nukie (1987) 

Nukie is a 1987 South African film directed by Sias Odendaal (credited as Sias Odendal) and Michael Pakleppa, and starring Steve Railsback, Ronald France, and Glynis Johns. The plot concerns an alien, Nukie, who crash lands on Earth and seeks help from two children to reunite with his brother, Miko, who has been captured by the United States government. The film is considered to be a knock-off of Steven Spielberg's 1982 film E.T. the Extra-Terrestrial. Witney Seibold of /Film writes that "Nukie is only remarkable for how undeniably terrible it is", noting that it appears on lists of the worst films ever made. Comic Book Resources note that it is  "regarded as one of the worst movies ever made", with critic Brad Jones selecting Nukie as the worst film he has ever seen, and Red Letter Media calling it "Possibly one of the worst films ever made." Total Film write that it is considered by some to be the "most painful movie ever made"; they listed Nukie the worst kids movie ever made and one of the worst science-fiction films ever made. The film's co-director, Michael Pakleppa, referred to Nukie as "the most wrong-gone thing [he had] ever done in [his] life" and feared that the final product was "the worst film on Earth."

 The Garbage Pail Kids Movie (1987) 

Based on the children's trading card series of the same name, which were popular at the time, this family film received overwhelmingly negative reviews from critics and viewers alike, with criticism primarily geared towards the film's over-reliance on crude humor, the improbable plot, and its message. The film was a box-office bomb, grossing only $1.6 million on a $1 million budget. It bears a 0% approval rating on Rotten Tomatoes and was nominated for three Razzie awards. Caryn James, writing for The New York Times, chastised the film as "too repulsive for children or adults of any age".

 Hobgoblins (1988) 

Hobgoblins, by Rick Sloane, is widely considered a low-budget knock-off that capitalizes on the popularity of the 1984 film Gremlins. It gained popularity in 1998 after being featured on an episode of Mystery Science Theater 3000. MST3K writer Paul Chaplin later commented on Hobgoblins, saying, "Oh, man. You have no idea the torture it was to watch this movie several times in the space of a week. It shoots right to the top of the list of the worst movies we've ever done." Specific points of the film that were lampooned were the extreme misogyny and atrocious treatment of women; the film's technical incompetence and repetitive scenes; its asinine, poorly conceived plot; its dreadful acting; and its ugly look and gratuitous vulgarity, particularly in regards to its characters and subject matter. David Cornelius of DVD Talk stated, "There's not one aspect of this movie that isn't the Worst Thing Ever." After seeing the MST3K episode himself, Sloane was inspired to direct a sequel, which was released in 2009.

 Mac and Me (1988) 

Mac and Me is about a young boy in a wheelchair who meets and befriends an alien who has crash-landed on Earth. A box-office failure, the film grossed $6,424,112 in the United States on a $13 million budget. It used to have a 0% rating on Rotten Tomatoes, whose critical consensus notes that it is "duly infamous" as both an imitation of E.T. the Extra-Terrestrial (1982), and a marketing vehicle for McDonald's and Coca-Cola (the filmmakers had admitted a profit-sharing arrangement with the former). Leonard Maltin described the film as being "more like a TV commercial than a movie", and Marjorie Baumgarten of the Austin Chronicle called it a "shameless E.T. knockoff". Mac and Me is widely regarded as one of the worst films ever made, with The Telegraph reporting that it is "frequently pulled out in 'worst film of all time' arguments". Filmmaker Morgan Spurlock (responsible for the 2004 Oscar-nominated Super Size Me) declared it the "worst thing you'll ever see in your entire life", as well as the most egregious example of product placement in cinema history. The film was also named the worst ever in the San Francisco Chronicle, as well as by broadcaster Simon Mayo and writer/producer Damon Lindelof. Michael Hayden of GQ India referred to it as "hands down the worst family movie in Hollywood history". The film was nominated for four Razzie Awards including Worst Picture and Worst Screenplay, and won two trophies: Worst Director for Stewart Raffill (tied with Blake Edwards for Sunset) and Worst New Star for Ronald McDonald in a cameo. Mac and Me has however gained a cult following and was featured on the second season of the Mystery Science Theater 3000 revival (the only Razzie-winning film ever to be riffed in the history of the show).10 MST3K Movies You Should Watch Without The Riffing - CBR

 Things (1989) 

Things, a 1989 Canadian low budget, independent, horror exploitation film, was written and produced by Andrew Jordan & Barry J. Gillis. It cost approximately $35,000 in total to make and marked the mainstream film debut of porn star Amber Lynn. It was ostensibly made as homage to horror icons and films, such as George A. Romero and his Night of the Living Dead franchise. Adam Symchuk of Screen Rant writes: "While films like The Room and Birdemic seem to be constant contenders for the best 'so bad it's good' movie, [Things] is the true unheralded champion among many cinephiles." Likewise, Jeff Kirschner of Dread Central nominated it as the worst movie ever made and Will Pfeifer opined that "It's so terrible I can’t think of another movie that even comes close." In 2022, RiffTrax concluded that Things was the worst movie that they had ever spoofed.

 1990s 

 Troll 2 (1990) 

Despite its title, Troll 2 does not feature any trolls (the antagonists are actually goblins) and has no relation to the original 1986 film, which was also poorly reviewed. NPR reports that it is "known as the worst movie of all time" while The A.V. Club calls it "a popular candidate for the worst film ever made". Rumsey Taylor of Not Coming to a Theater Near You opined that it was "one of the worst films I've ever seen". Ken Hanke of Mountain Xpress gave it one-half star out of five, and stated in his review, "There are movies that are bad. There are movies that are so-bad-they're-good. And then there's Troll 2—a movie that's so bad that it defies comprehension." In addition, TV Guide proclaimed that "Troll 2 is really as bad as they come." Nearly twenty years after its release, the movie's child star, Michael Stephenson, made a documentary about its production and fanbase titled Best Worst Movie, released to critical success in 2009. The bad acting and dialogue have become notorious for their camp value; the scene in which Darren Ewing's character states that he will be eaten next has become an Internet meme.

 Highlander II: The Quickening (theatrical version, 1991) 

The French-British film Highlander II: The Quickening is a sequel to the 1986 cult film Highlander, which transitions the fantasy of the original film into science fiction, and retcons the mystical warriors of the first film into aliens. It received a harsh reception from both critics and audiences. Common criticisms included the lack of motivation for the characters, blatant disregard for backstory from the first film (such as the new and seemingly incongruent origin for the Immortals and the unexplained resurrection of Ramirez), glaring plot holes, a messy and nonsensical story structure, the filmmaker's inability to balance unrelated plots and subplots, and obvious contradictions in the film's internal logic. In selecting it as the worst movie sequel of all time, Comic Book Resources also wrote that "it is typically considered one of the worst films of all time." Roger Ebert named it the worst film of 1991, stating: "If there is a planet somewhere whose civilization is based on the worst movies of all time, Highlander 2: The Quickening deserves a sacred place among their most treasured artifacts." An IGN review said: "How bad is this movie? Well, imagine if Ed Wood were alive today, and someone gave him a multi-million dollar budget. See his imagination running rampant, bringing in aliens from outer space with immensely powerful firearms, immortals who bring each other back to life by calling out their names, epic duels on flying skateboards, and a blatant disregard for anything logical or previously established—now you are starting to get closer to the vision of Highlander II." Screen Rant has since included it on its list of the 25 worst films of all time.

In 1995, the film's director Russell Mulcahy made a director's cut version known as Highlander 2: Renegade Version and then later released another version simply known as Highlander 2: The Special Edition for its 2004 DVD release. The film was reconstructed on both occasions largely from existing material, with certain scenes removed and others added back in, and the entire sequence of events changed. The reconstructed film's reception was far better than the original's; it was elevated to a mixed reception.

 Super Mario Bros. (1993) 

The first feature-length live-action film based on a video game, Super Mario Bros. was directed by the husband-and-wife team of Rocky Morton and Annabel Jankel (known for their work on Max Headroom). It follows the brothers Mario (Bob Hoskins) and Luigi (John Leguizamo), plumbers who venture into a parallel universe to rescue Princess Daisy (Samantha Mathis) from the villainous King Koopa (Dennis Hopper). The Super Mario series' publisher, Nintendo, believed the Mario franchise was strong enough for experimentation and gave the filmmakers free creative license. As a result, the film bears little resemblance to the games, trading their colorful Mushroom Kingdom for a dystopic world populated by humanoid dinosaurs. SyFy Wire wrote: "Some movies are so bad that they're secretly good. [Super Mario Bros.] is so bad it crushes your spirit. It's unfathomably terrible." The film was criticized for its inconsistent tone, complex narrative, and lack of faithfulness to the source material. It was voted the sixth worst film of all time by RiffTrax in 2012, and IGN ranked it among the "best worst movies ever made" in 2021. Author David Bodanis, in his 2020 book The Art of Fairness, called Super Mario Bros. "the worst movie ever made".

In addition to scathing reviews, Super Mario Bros. was a box-office bomb, and Morton and Jankel were "blacklisted" as directors in Hollywood. In a 2007 interview, Hoskins said: "The worst thing I ever did? Super Mario Bros. It was a fuckin' nightmare. The whole experience was a nightmare. It had a husband-and-wife team directing, whose arrogance had been mistaken for talent. After so many weeks their own agent told them to get off the set! Fuckin' nightmare. Fuckin' idiots." In a 2011 interview, he was asked, "What is the worst job you've done?", "What has been your biggest disappointment?", and "If you could edit your past, what would you change?" His answer to all three was Super Mario Bros. The film made Nintendo wary of licensing its intellectual properties to film studios, and it did not license the Mario franchise again to film studios until 30 years later, where they collaborated with Illumination for The Super Mario Bros. Movie in 2023.

 North (1994) 

The Rob Reiner film North is an adaptation of the novel North: The Tale of a 9-Year-Old Boy Who Becomes a Free Agent and Travels the World in Search of the Perfect Parents by Alan Zweibel, who also wrote the screenplay and has a minor role in the film. North, which was also Scarlett Johansson's film debut, was a critical and commercial failure, earning only $7,138,449 worldwide despite its budget of over $40 million. It was widely criticized for its plot, its all-star cast of insensitive characters, lack of humor and portrayal of numerous ethnic stereotypes (especially Alaskan Inuit). It has a 14% approval rating at Rotten Tomatoes. Roger Ebert gave it zero stars and, in his review, infamously wrote, "I hated this movie. Hated hated hated hated hated this movie. Hated it. Hated every simpering stupid vacant audience-insulting moment of it. Hated the sensibility that thought anyone would like it. Hated the implied insult to the audience by its belief that anyone would be entertained by it." He continued saying ""North" is a bad film – one of the worst movies ever made", and it is also on his list of most hated films. Both Ebert and Gene Siskel named North as the worst film of 1994. Mick LaSalle of the San Francisco Chronicle said in his review that "North is director Rob Reiner's first flat-out failure, a sincerely wrought, energetically made picture that all the same crashes on takeoff. It's strange and oddly distasteful, at its best managing to be bad in some original and unexpected ways." Richard Roeper named North as one of the 40 worst movies he has ever seen, saying that, "Of all the films on this list, North may be the most difficult to watch from start to finish." The film was nominated for the following awards at the 15th Golden Raspberry Awards: Worst Picture, Worst Actor (Bruce Willis, also for Color of Night), Worst Supporting Actress (Kathy Bates), Worst Supporting Actor (Dan Aykroyd, also for Exit to Eden), Worst Director, and Worst Screenplay (Andrew Scheinman and Alan Zweibel).

 Dis – en historie om kjærlighet (A Story About Love) (1995) 

The Norwegian romantic film Dis – en historie om kjærlighet was directed by Aune Sand. The film follows different couples and their love stories around the world, in Cairo, Normandy, Oslo and New York City. Dis received universally poor reviews by critics, and has been called the most poorly reviewed Norwegian film in history. Critic Harald Kolstad of Dagsavisen gave it a score of zero, refused to acknowledge Dis as a film, and claimed to have never seen anything worse. Aftenposten referred to the film as "the largest turkey" and "the most reviled film", and Total Film included it on its list of the 66 worst films ever made. Despite being a critical disaster it became a commercial success, gaining cult film status with a following akin to The Rocky Horror Picture Show, with fans embracing its "so bad it's good" qualities. Director Aune Sand insists that Dis is a masterpiece.

 Showgirls (1995) 

Hype for Paul Verhoeven's erotic drama Showgirls focused on the sex and nudity in this NC-17 French-American film with a $45 million budget, but the final result was critically derided. Much hype revolved around the film's star, Elizabeth Berkley, who only two years before had starred in the lighthearted and chaste teen sitcom Saved by the Bell. The film won seven Razzie Awards, a record at that time, and received 13 nominations, a record that still stands. It received an additional award at the 20th Golden Raspberry Awards, where it was awarded Worst Picture of the Decade. Kenneth Turan of the Los Angeles Times called it, "a film of thunderous oafishness that gives adult subject matter the kind of bad name it does not need or deserve". Michael Dequina of TheMovieReport.com also criticized the film, claiming that it was "the best bad filmmaking Hollywood has to offer". Adam White wrote in The Independent that it was "the worst movie ever made" but also a masterpiece. Stephen Lynch of the Knight Ridder/Tribune similarly named it the worst movie ever made, calling it "so bad it may be brilliant". Various sources have since included Showgirls in their respective lists of the worst films ever made, including: Rotten Tomatoes, Empire, Screen Rant, Vanity Fair, and Flavorwire. Showgirls was also featured in Michael Sauter's The Worst Movies of All Time as well as The Official Razzie Movie Guide. Despite being a critical failure and failing at the box office initially, Showgirls found success as a camp cult film, particularly among the LGBT community, but whether the film was intended to be satirical remains subject to debate. On the home video market, the film was MGM's most profitable release for years.

 The Scarlet Letter (1995) 

A "freely adapted" version of the 1850 romantic novel by Nathaniel Hawthorne, directed by Roland Joffé and starring Demi Moore and Gary Oldman. The film met with universally negative reviews and was a box-office bomb, grossing $10.4 million against a production budget of $46 million. Multiple critics named the film the worst of 1995.

Chris Hicks of the Deseret News argued that its deviation from the source material represents "Hollywood's arrogance in its purest form". The Washington Posts Amy E. Schwartz reported that the "nutty" film was described by numerous reviewers as the worst they had ever seen. Kevin Williamson of National Review observed a "combination of awfulness and inexplicability", and claimed that "any objective and authoritative analysis will reveal that the worst film ever made is Demi Moore's version of The Scarlet Letter". Sadie Trombetta of Bustle wrote that it "has earned an almost permanent spot on every 'Worst Movie of All Time' list", while author Libby Fischer Hellmann noted that it is "widely cited as the worst film adaptation ever made". The film was nominated for seven Golden Raspberry Awards, winning "Worst Remake or Sequel". Furthermore, Roger Ebert placed the film on his "most hated" list.

Bio-Dome (1996)

The 1996 comedy film Bio-Dome focuses on two moronic stoner best friends, played by Pauly Shore and Stephen Baldwin, who accidentally get trapped inside of the Bio-Dome, a hermetically sealed ecological system, after mistaking it for a mall while looking for a bathroom.

For MTV News, Eric Snider wrote in 2008 that "nothing can account for...the movie Bio-Dome, which is–and I do not make this assertion lightly–the worst crime ever perpetrated against humanity throughout all of recorded history". Snider went on to call it "quite bad" and "certainly one of the worst comedies" he had ever seen, criticizing Pauly Shore's performance as unfunny and the film's writing as stupid. Syfy Wires Cassidy Ward described Bio-Dome as "one of the best-worst movies of all time", stating that its plot "strains credulity", while Jon O'Brien of Inverse called it "one of the worst movies ever made" and wrote that it "has nothing to offer but unconvincing pratfalls...tumbleweed one-liners...and some unashamed sexism, too". It was described as "almost unwatchably awful" and "a baffling piece of work" by Charles Bramesco of Uproxx, who wrote that it was a "perennial contender in the battle for the title of Worst Movie Ever". The A.V. Clubs Nathan Rabin wrote, "Critics and audiences alike found the Bio-Dome to be an abomination unto the Lord, an affront to the gods of cinema, and also a very bad movie, bad enough to be considered the gold standard of crapitude in Shore's oeuvre," noting that it had the lowest Metacritic score of any movie, with 1 out of 100. Bio-Dome was named one of the worst movies of the 1990s in a poll conducted by RiffTrax.

Kylie Minogue, who starred in the film as oceanographer Petra von Kant, called appearing in the film the worst decision of her career. For his performance in the movie, Shore won the Golden Raspberry Award for Worst Actor at the 17th Golden Raspberry Awards, tying with Tom Arnold for his performance in Big Bully.

 Striptease (1996) 

A comedy-drama directed by Andrew Bergman, based on a novel by Carl Hiaasen, Striptease centers on a woman (Demi Moore) who becomes a stripper in order to fund an appeal for custody of her daughter. The film was criticized as boring and humourless, and was also accused of being a vanity project for Moore. Daniel P. Franklin, discussing Striptease in his book Politics and Film: The Political Culture of Film in the United States stated "This is the worst film ever made." Joe Queenan cited Striptease as an example of what he considered the poor quality of contemporary Hollywood cinema: "One thing that I admire about films like Striptease is that they serve as powerful reminders that on any given day, Hollywood has the potential to release the worst film in history."

Leonard Maltin stated that Striptease was "Not funny enough, or dramatic enough, or sexy enough, or bad enough, to qualify as entertainment in any category." Brian D. Johnson of Maclean's stated "While Showgirls was honestly sleazy, Striptease is tacky, pretentious – and boring. Trying to be a comedy, a morality tale and a titillating sideshow, Striptease fails on all counts."

Striptease was awarded six Golden Raspberry awards, for Worst Picture, Worst Director, Worst Screenplay, Worst Actress (Moore), Worst Original Song ("(Pussy Pussy Pussy) Whose Kitty Cat Are You?"), and Worst Screen Couple (Moore and Burt Reynolds).

 Batman & Robin (1997) 

Batman & Robin is a superhero film based on the DC character Batman and is the fourth and final installment of the Burton/Schumacher Batman film series. It is directed by Joel Schumacher and stars George Clooney as Batman/Bruce Wayne, Arnold Schwarzenegger as Mr. Freeze, Uma Thurman as Poison Ivy, Chris O'Donnell as Robin/Dick Grayson, Alicia Silverstone as Batgirl/Barbara Wilson and Michael Gough as Alfred Pennyworth. This film was largely criticized for its toyetic and camp approach, and Mr. Freeze's approach and one-line jokes.

, review aggregator Rotten Tomatoes reports that 11% of critics have given the film a positive review based on 89 reviews, certifying it "Rotten" with an average rating of 3.7/10, and the critics consensus: "Joel Schumacher's tongue-in-cheek attitude hits an unbearable limit in Batman & Robin, resulting in a frantic and mindless movie that's too jokey to care much for." By comparison Metacritic collected an average score of 28/100, based on 21 reviews. Michael J. Nelson, of Mystery Science Theater 3000 fame, wrote of the movie in his book, Movie Megacheese, "Batman & Robin is not the worst movie ever. No, indeed. It's the worst thing ever. Yes, it's the single worst thing that we as human beings have ever produced in recorded history." Batman & Robin also came in first in an Empire poll of the 50 worst films ever. Joel Schumacher apologized to disappointed fans on the 2005 DVD release of Batman & Robin.

 The Avengers (1998) 

An adaptation of the popular 1960s British series of the same name, The Avengers starred Ralph Fiennes as John Steed and Uma Thurman as Emma Peel, with Sean Connery as their antagonist, Sir August de Wynter. It was directed by Jeremiah S. Chechik. The Avengers began to receive negative publicity after Warner Bros., the film's distributor, refused to allow any early press-screenings for movie reviewers. After early test screenings, The Avengers was heavily edited by the studio. On its release, The Avengers was savaged by film critics, with the Birmingham Post stating "The Avengers is being slated by critics as the worst film ever made" and adding that one reviewer had joked the film was such a "turkey" that the makers should have handed distribution to the poultry chain Bernard Matthews. Several reviewers disparaged The Avengers for lacking the wit and excitement of its source material. Janet Maslin strongly criticised The Avengers: "With pseudo-suave repartee that would make Austin Powers blush and with so many shades of Howard the Duck that one scene depicts man-size pastel teddy bears sitting around a conference table, it's a film to gall fans of the old television series and perplex anyone else. I can't remember another Friday morning show where I heard actual cries of "Ugh!" on the way out the door" and finished her review with, "At a pared-down, barely rational 100 minutes, The Avengers is short but not short enough."

David Bianculli said, "This Avengers film is so horrendously, painfully and thoroughly awful, it gives other cinematic clunkers like Ishtar and Howard the Duck a good name." Alan Jones in The Radio Times stated "The cult 1960s TV series gets royally shafted by Hollywood in this stunningly designed blockbuster that's stunningly awful in every other department ... Terrible special effects and zero chemistry between Fiennes and Thurman make this notorious disaster a total waste of everyone's time and energy." The Avengers also shared a Razzie Award for "Worst Remake or Sequel" with the 1998 adaptations of Psycho and Godzilla at the 19th Golden Raspberry Awards. Total Film magazine later voted Fiennes and Thurman in The Avengers as "The Worst Movie Double Act Of All Time". The film also appeared on Metacritic's list of the all-time lowest-scoring films.

 Fatal Deviation (1998) 

Fatal Deviation is often credited as being the first martial arts film to be filmed in Ireland. It stars martial artist James Bennett and Michael Graham, who is best known for being a member of the boy band Boyzone. The Irish Post and Den of Geek write that it is a mainstay of worst film lists. Luke McKinney of Cracked.com called it the worst film ever made, writing: "There are so many things about making a movie that Jimmy doesn't know, that you could replace film school with this movie alone--just screening it once for students and asking them to list all the things it did wrong. Anyone who doesn't write 'everything' instantly fails." The Irish Post named it the worst Irish film of all time, the Irish Independent wrote that it is "regarded as one of the worst films ever made" and Comic Book Resources called it " one of the worst commercial movies ever made". Entertainment.ie placed it on its list of "10 So Bad They're Good Movies You Need To See Before You Die" and it was covered in Pastes Bad Movie Diaries column.

 Parting Shots (1999) 

The British black comedy Parting Shots was the last film directed by Michael Winner. It starred rock musician Chris Rea as a man who, told he has only six months to live, begins murdering people who have wronged him. Andrew Collins took a very negative view of the film: "Parting Shots ... is going to set the course of British film-making back 20 years. It is not only the worst British film produced in this country since Carry On Emmannuelle (quite a feat in itself), it is a thoroughbred contender for the crown of Worst Film Ever Made." In an interview about the film, Charlotte O'Sullivan, the Independent's film editor, claimed Parting Shots was "the worst film I've ever seen". O'Sullivan also criticised it for glorifying vigilantism: "It's Michael Winner and you know, he doesn't have any sense of irony. He seems to be saying it is okay to go and kill people." The journalist Miles Kington later claimed "Parting Shots ... was directed by Michael Winner and despite the glittering cast, was possibly the worst film ever made." I. Q. Hunter listed Parting Shots as one of the candidates for "the Worst British film ever made". Parting Shots was also featured in a poll of Empire magazine readers' "50 Worst Movies Ever" poll.

 The Underground Comedy Movie (1999) 

The Underground Comedy Movie is based on a cable access show from 1988. Director and lead actor Vince Offer constructed the film out of a series of tasteless, lowbrow skits (including Gena Lee Nolin loudly using the restroom and a superhero named Dickman who dresses in a giant penis costume and defeats his enemies by squirting them with semen). In 1999, Offer filed a suit against 20th Century Fox and the co-directors of There's Something About Mary, Bobby and Peter Farrelly, claiming that 14 scenes in Mary were stolen from his film. The Farrellys released this statement: "We've never heard of him, we've never heard of his movie, and it's all a bunch of baloney." Lawrence Van Gelder of The New York Times referred to it as a "wretched film" and stated that "'The Underground Comedy Movie' stands as a monument to ineptitude and self-delusion." Rod Dreher of the New York Post said it "may be the least amusing comedy ever made". Dave Shulman of L.A. Weekly described it as a "serious contender for the single worst movie ever made", while Stinkers Bad Movie Awards co-founder Mike Lancaster said that it was the worst film that he had ever paid to see. Nathan Rabin covered the film in his column detailing terrible films and stated that: "nothing I’ve covered for this column was quite as soul-crushingly, brain-meltingly terrible as ... The Underground Comedy Movie." Thom Bennett at Film Journal International, wrote "Anyone offended by unbearably bad films, jokes that are not funny and wasting 90 minutes of their lives is, as promised, guaranteed to be offended. In fact, to even call this mess a comedy is giving it far too much credit", and "The Underground Comedy Movie may well be the worst film I have ever seen." Writing in Central Western Daily, Peter Young said, "I am pretty sure that I can declare this The Worst Film I Have Ever Seen."

 2000s 

 Battlefield Earth (2000) 

Battlefield Earth is based on the first half of L. Ron Hubbard's novel of the same name, and stars John Travolta, Barry Pepper and Forest Whitaker. Although a sequel covering the second half of the book was planned, the panning from critics, poor box-office performance, and financial ruin of Franchise Pictures killed off such plans. It was criticized for a poor script, hammy acting, overuse of Dutch angles, repetitive dialogue, and several inconsistencies and plot holes. The movie's producer, Franchise Pictures, was later forced out of business after it emerged that it had fraudulently overstated the film's budget by $31 million. It has a 3% rating at Rotten Tomatoes, and it was included in their Top 100 worst-reviewed movies of the 2000s. Roger Ebert predicted that the film, "for decades to come will be the punch line of jokes about bad movies". Ebert also wrote, "The director, Roger Christian, has learned from better films that directors sometimes tilt their cameras, but he has not learned why". It is also on his "most hated" list.

Nathan Rabin covered the film as part of his My World of Flops column for The A.V. Club, calling it "a fiasco that occupies a distinguished place high atop the pantheon of widely reviled crap" and said, "A legendary disaster well before it finished completion, Battlefield Earth hit theaters with a "Kick Me" sign on it so massive it could be detected from outer space." It won seven Golden Raspberry Awards, including Worst Picture and Worst Screen Couple (John Travolta and "anyone on the screen with him"). In 2005, an eighth Razzie (for Worst "Drama" of Our First 25 Years) was awarded to the film, and in 2010 it won a ninth Razzie at the 30th Golden Raspberry Awards for Worst Picture of the Decade, the most of any film in the history of the awards at the time, before Jack and Jill surpassed its record with ten wins in 2012. The movie appeared on Metacritic's list of the all-time lowest-scoring films, and is on the Movie Review Query Engine's (MRQE) 50 Worst Movies list, as well as worst film lists from Screen Rant, Vanity Fair, Flavorwire, Digital Trends and the New York Daily News. Empire named it the second worst movie ever made after Batman & Robin and The Register listed it as the worst movie ever made. Pepper and Whitaker both expressed regret for their involvement in Battlefield Earth, while film screenwriter J. David Shapiro later apologized for making "the suckiest movie ever".

Titanic: The Legend Goes On (2000)

It features a similar romantic storyline to James Cameron's 1997 Titanic film, but also has a number of talking animals (most notably, a rapping dog). Reviews condemned the quality of the animation and criticized the plot for being insensitive to the memory of the victims of the Titanic. Total Film named Titanic: The Legend Goes On as "officially the worst film ever made", after it topped a list of the 66 worst films ever. Critic Trim Brayton said that "It is one of the most surreally bad films I have ever encountered", adding: "For sheer mesmerising grotesqueness, there's almost nothing I can name that beats it, and no fan of bad movies can say that their life is complete till they've been exposed to it." Total Film also included the film on a list of the worst kid's movies, describing it as being "widely considered one of the worst animated films ever made", while Spanish film magazine Fotogramas selected it as one of the 20 worst films ever made. Screen Rant included it on a list of the twelve worst animated films of all time, and it topped a Showbiz Cheat Sheet list of the top ten worst animated films ever, with author Will Roberts commenting that "[any] list of the worst animated films of all time begins with ... Titanic: The Legend Goes On". 

 Freddy Got Fingered (2001) 

The comedy film Freddy Got Fingered stars Tom Green, who also wrote and directed it, featuring largely gross-out and shock humor similar to that featured in The Tom Green Show. In the film, Green stars as a 28-year-old slacker and cartoonist who falsely accuses his father of child molestation when he questions his son's life goals. Freddy Got Fingered received overwhelmingly negative reviews, with CNN critic Paul Clinton declaring it "quite simply the worst movie ever released by a major studio in Hollywood history." Warren Epstein of The Gazette described Freddy Got Fingered as "the worst movie ever made". A review in The Washington Post said: "If ever a movie testified to the utter creative bankruptcy of the Hollywood film industry, it is the abomination known as Freddy Got Fingered." Robert Koehler of Variety called it, "One of the most brutally awful comedies ever to emerge from a major studio." Roger Ebert included the film on his "most hated" list, gave it zero out of four stars, and wrote: "This movie doesn't scrape the bottom of the barrel. This movie isn't the bottom of the barrel. This movie isn't below the bottom of the barrel. This movie doesn't deserve to be mentioned in the same sentence with barrels."

Freddy Got Fingered was nominated for eight awards at the 2001 Razzies, and won for Worst Picture, Worst Actor, Worst Director, Worst Screenplay, and Worst On-Screen Couple. Razzies founder John J. B. Wilson called it "offensive, stupid and obnoxious" and said it had "no redeeming value". Green accepted his awards in person, traveling to the ceremony in a white Cadillac, wearing a tuxedo and rolling out his own red carpet to the presentation. The movie has an 11% rating on Rotten Tomatoes. In 2010, the film was nominated at the 30th Golden Raspberry Awards for Worst Picture of the Decade, though it lost to Battlefield Earth. Freddy Got Fingered also appeared on Metacritic's list of the all-time lowest-scoring films, was featured in Empire list of the "50 Worst Movies Ever" poll, and is on the MRQE's 50 Worst Movies list.

 Glitter (2001) 

Starring Mariah Carey in the lead role as an aspiring singer in 1980s New York City, the romantic musical drama Glitter was intended to be her breakthrough role but was a critical failure and a box-office bomb. Hindustan Times claimed that Glitter "was slammed by almost all critics for being the worst film ever". Fade In stated that "Glitter isn't just one of the worst music-themed films ever — it's one of the worst films ever made, period." Author Bob McCann wrote in Encyclopedia of African American Actresses in Film and Television that it's "rightfully in the running as one of the worst films ever made". News.com.au, Hi, Flavorwire, Screen Rant, Vanity Fair, Metacritic, and Empire are amongst those who have listed it as one of the worst films ever made.

Glitter received six Razzie nominations, and Carey won for Worst Actress. It was also featured in The Official Razzie Movie Guide, and in 2005, it was nominated for "Worst Musical of Our First 25 Years", but lost to From Justin to Kelly. In an interview in 2010, Carey stated that she believed that the film's failure at the box office was largely due to the soundtrack being released the same day as the September 11 attacks. It has a 7% rating on Rotten Tomatoes based on 87 reviews.

 Swept Away (2002) 

A remake of a 1974 Italian film of the same name, the romantic comedy film Swept Away was directed by Guy Ritchie and starred his then-wife Madonna and Adriano Giannini. It received overwhelmingly negative reviews, with most of the criticism going towards Madonna's bad acting, the original film being considered superior and the remake being considered just a star vehicle for Madonna. Rex Reed of The New York Observer said: "If there is one thing worse than a Guy Ritchie movie, it's a Guy Ritchie movie with Madonna in it." Newsday critic John Anderson said, "New ways of describing badness need to be invented to describe exactly how bad it is." Joe Queenan of The Guardian discussed the movie in an article on what makes a movie the worst of all time and said, "[...] Showgirls has a certain campy allure that grows a bit each time I see it. Madonna's Swept Away doesn't; it seems more amateurish on each viewing, like a morass that starts out as a quagmire, then morphs into a cesspool and finally turns into a slime pit on the road to its ultimate destination in the bowels of Hell." Julie Burchill, also from The Guardian, selected it as her pick for the worst film ever made.

Swept Away was also a box-office bomb; against a $10 million budget, it grossed $598,645 in the United States and around $437,875 from foreign territories for a worldwide total gross of $1,036,520. It received five awards at the 23rd Golden Raspberry Awards and became the first film to win both Worst Picture and Worst Remake or Sequel. At the 25th Golden Raspberry Awards, it was nominated for Worst "Drama" of Our First 25 Years, and at the 30th Golden Raspberry Awards, it was nominated for Worst Picture of the Decade, but 'lost' to Battlefield Earth at both ceremonies. Empire ranked it #20 in its list of "The 50 Worst Movies Ever", and After Ellen ranked it #7 in its list of "The worst movies ever to grace the screen".

 The Master of Disguise (2002) 

The comedy film The Master of Disguise was produced in part by Adam Sandler and stars Dana Carvey as Pistachio Disguisey, an undercover Italian waiter who must save his father Fabbrizio (James Brolin) from the evil Devlin Bowman (Brent Spiner) by using his inherent skills in disguise. Although the film was a box office success, it received scathing reviews from critics upon its release, many of which pointed out its sophomoric plot, unfunny humor (in particular, its flatulence gags) and disguises that would clearly not be recognized by children (such as Tony Montana from Scarface). Many critics also pointed out the short running time, consisting of 72 minutes of the film itself and over ten minutes of end credits juxtaposed with outtakes. Roger Ebert gave it one star out of four, claiming, "The movie is a desperate miscalculation. It gives poor Dana Carvey nothing to do that is really funny, and then expects us to laugh because he acts so goofy all the time." Alan Morrison, writing for Empire, proclaimed that The Master of Disguise was "the worst film ever made: a film about idiots, made by idiots, for idiots", while Matthew Turner of ViewLondon remarked, "This is a serious contender for the title of The worst Film Ever Made." The film holds a 1% rating on Rotten Tomatoes based on 104 reviews, and was featured on the site's list of the top 100 worst-reviewed films of the 2000s. It also appears on Metacritic's list of the all-time lowest-scoring films, and is on the MRQE's 50 Worst Movies list. A cameo appearance by Bo Derek landed her a nomination for Worst Supporting Actress at the 23rd Golden Raspberry Awards, but she lost to Madonna for Die Another Day.

 Ballistic: Ecks vs. Sever (2002) 

The action film Ballistic: Ecks vs. Sever stars Antonio Banderas and Lucy Liu as opposing secret agents. Critics panned it, generally regarding it as having no redeeming features, not even the unintentional comedic value normally associated with bad films. They variously described the film as "A picture for idiots", "Boring to an amazing degree", "A fine achievement in stupidity and dullness", "Dreadful", "[Giving] new meaning to the word incoherent", and "bad on just about every level". One critic suggested an alternative title as "Simplistic: Bullets Vs. Humans". Stephen Hunter of The Washington Post wrote, "You could run this film backward, soundtrack included, and it would make no less sense." Roger Ebert, who included the film in his "most hated list", called the movie "a chaotic mess, overloaded with special effects and explosions, light on continuity, sanity and coherence." In addition to being lambasted by critics, it was a disaster financially, recouping just over $19.9 million of its $70 million budget. In March 2007, Rotten Tomatoes ranked it #1 among "The Worst of the Worst" movie list, with 108 "rotten" reviews and no "fresh" ones. Mental Floss also listed it as the worst movie ever made.

 Ben and Arthur (2002) 

A low-budget 2002 American romantic drama film about the titular gay couple who come into conflict with Arthur's religious brother, Ben and Arthur was written, directed, produced, edited, and scored by Sam Mraovich, who also played the character Arthur. Ben and Arthur received strong criticism (especially from the LGBT community) for its low budget and poor plotting. BuzzFeed described it as the "worst gay movie of all time". The gay popular culture site Queerty described Ben and Arthur as "unintelligible" and ended its review by calling it the "Worst. Movie. Ever." The gay movie review site Cinemaqueer likewise stated: "Ben and Arthur is so terrible that it has awoken the dormant Bette Davis in me. It is so painfully bad that it wouldn't even make good fodder on Mystery Science Theater 3000. This just might possibly be the worst movie I have ever seen ... Unless you get a kick out of mocking bad films, avoid this one at all costs." Michael Adams, reviewing the film for his book Showgirls, Teen Wolves, and Astro Zombies, describes it thus: "Ben & Arthur is as over-the-top insane as it is ludicrously executed ... the production values, from biscuits on plates comprising the main course of a candlelit dinner to a church literally having a cardboard cross and a cartoon Jesus on the wall, are as bad as anything I've seen." A Rotten Tomatoes article placed Ben and Arthur on their list of "Films So Bad They're Unmissable", saying "If Tommy Wiseau's The Room is the over-wrought, melodramatic and self-pitying heterosexual camp classic of choice, then Sam Mraovich's Ben & Arthur is its gay equivalent." Rotten Tomatoes also stated "Every scene, every line, every hissy fit is simultaneously hilariously amateur and hysterically fever-pitched." Total Film ranked Ben and Arthur at No. 58 in their list of the 66 worst films of all time. Mraovich finds Ben and Arthurs placement among the canon of worst films to be a blessing as the film has received more attention than he ever anticipated.

 From Justin to Kelly (2003) 

The romantic-comedy musical From Justin to Kelly stars Kelly Clarkson and Justin Guarini, the winner and runner-up, respectively, of the first season of American Idol. The film was a critical and commercial disaster, earning only $4.9 million at the North American box office and achieving a 10% rating on Rotten Tomatoes based on 63 reviews. Josh Tyrangiel of Time Magazine described From Justin to Kelly as "a monstrous Idol movie musical that in the most generous light is the worst film so far this century", while The Free Lance–Star referred to it as "the world's worst movie". Nathan Rabin, reviewing the film for his "My Year of Flops" series, stated, "All films require suspension of disbelief. From Justin To Kelly requires something more like a temporary lobotomy. Nothing about the main characters or their relationships makes sense." It won a special Razzie—"Governor's Award – Distinguished Under-Achievement in Choreography"—at the 24th Golden Raspberry Awards. It was nominated for eight additional Razzies (including a second special award, "Worst Excuse for an Actual Movie"), and a year later it won for Worst "Musical" of Our First 25 Years. Total Film, Screen Rant and Digital Trends included From Justin to Kelly on their worst film lists. In a later interview, Clarkson expressed regret over From Justin to Kelly, stating she only did it because she was contractually obligated to do so: "I knew when I read the script it was going to be real, real bad, but when I won, I signed that piece of paper, and I could not get out of it."

 The Room (2003) 

The independently produced The Room, about an amiable banker whose friends betray him one by one, has been called "the Citizen Kane of bad movies" by some critics. The Guardian, Vox, The Washington Post, ABC Australia and Süddeutsche Zeitung called it the worst film ever made. Ignatiy Vishnevetsky of The A.V. Club called it "the greatest bad movie of our time" and said, "The Room is nearly an anti-film—an inane and unintentionally surreal soap opera, filled with non sequiturs, confused characters, and gratuitous, anatomically incorrect sex." Though the film's star, writer, producer, and director Tommy Wiseau has claimed it is a black comedy and its numerous flaws are intentional, other actors involved in the production have denied this, saying that Wiseau intended it as a melodramatic romance.

The Room has been noted for its bizarre and non-sequiturial dialogue, protracted sex scenes, various subplots that are inadequately resolved or simply disappear altogether (most notably, a character announces that she has been diagnosed with breast cancer, but this is never mentioned again throughout the entire film), and infamous use of green-screen for "outdoor" rooftop scenes. It made its broadcast premiere as an April Fools' Day special in 2009 on Cartoon Network's Adult Swim block, edited down from its original R rating to a TV-14/DSLV rating. The day after its appearance, its DVD became the top-selling independent film on Amazon.com. In June 2010, The Room started playing at the American Film Institute Silver Theatre in Silver Spring, Maryland. Mystery Science Theater 3000 alumni Michael J. Nelson, Kevin Murphy, and Bill Corbett produced an audio commentary track to accompany the movie through their site RiffTrax.com. In 2013, the book The Disaster Artist, written by Greg Sestero and Tom Bissell, was published; the book is Sestero's memoir of his involvement in the production of the movie. The book was adapted into an Oscar-nominated film of the same name, directed by and starring James Franco as Wiseau (winning a Best Actor Golden Globe Award for his performance) and his brother Dave Franco as Sestero.

 Gigli (2003) 

The Martin Brest movie Gigli features Jennifer Lopez and Ben Affleck, with appearances by Al Pacino and Christopher Walken. Gigli was originally a black comedy with no romantic subplot, but the producers demanded script rewrites throughout filming, hoping to cash in on the Lopez–Affleck romance that was then big news in celebrity-watching publications such as Us and People. This film cost $54 million to make but grossed only $6 million, making it one of the biggest box-office bombs of all time. The Times gave the film a zero, making Gigli the lowest-scored film review in the publication's history at that time. The Wall Street Journal stated that it was "[t]he worst movie—all right, the worst allegedly major movie—of our admittedly young century", while Roger Friedman of Fox News claimed it was "[t]he worst movie ever made". It was also the winner of seven Razzies (including 2005's Worst "Comedy" of Our First 25 Years), and in 2010 the film was nominated at the 30th Golden Raspberry Awards for "Worst Picture of the Decade". It is in Rotten Tomatoes' Top 100 worst-reviewed movies of the 2000s, where it has a 6% rating. AfterEllen ranked Gigli number 1 in its list of the worst films of all time. Empire, Screen Rant, and Digital Trends also listed it as one of the worst films ever made.

 Sex Lives of the Potato Men (2004) 

The 2004 British sex comedy Sex Lives of the Potato Men is about a group of potato delivery men. The film received strongly hostile reviews from the British media. Reviews claimed Sex Lives of the Potato Men was unfunny, disgusting, and depressing. Writing in the Daily Mirror, film critic Kevin O'Sullivan called Sex Lives of the Potato Men "one of the worst films ever made". Novelist Will Self, in his review for The Evening Standard, called Sex Lives of the Potato Men "mirthless, worthless, toothless, useless". The Times reviewer James Christopher dubbed Sex Lives of the Potato Men "one of the two most nauseous films ever made ... a masterclass in film-making ineptitude". The Sunday Express film critic, Henry Fitzherbert, also strongly condemned the film: "Sex Lives is so awful it left me slack-jawed in disbelief ... it must be one of the worst British comedies." Catherine Shoard, in a critique in The Sunday Telegraph, stated "It's hard to know what to say to this – it's like finding the right words at a nasty accident ... Sex Lives of the Potato Men is probably the lewdest Brit-com since Confessions of a Window Cleaner, and certainly the worst." Shoard also described the film as "Less a film than an appetite suppressant." Alan Morrison in the Scottish Daily Record described it as "puerile smut of the very worst kind ... Sex Lives of the Potato Men should never have been made". The Irish Times later noted that "Sex Lives of the Potato Men attracted some of the worst reviews in living memory." The Birmingham Post described Sex Lives of the Potato Men as "quite possibly the worst film ever made", while The Independent on Sunday stated that the film was "a strong contender for the title of worst film of all time". It was also featured in Empires 50 Worst Movies Ever poll. The film has a 0% rating on Rotten Tomatoes, based on 14 reviews.

 Catwoman (2004) 

Nominally based on the DC Comics character, Catwoman stars Halle Berry as the title character. The film was the result of various rewrites by a total of 28 different screenwriters, though only four were credited after arbitration with the Writers Guild of America. It has a 9% rating at Rotten Tomatoes, and was declared "arguably the worst superhero film ever made" by the Orlando Sentinel. Jean Lowerison of the San Diego Metropolitan said in her review that Catwoman "goes on my 'worst' list for the year, and quite possibly for all time". Sadaf Ahsan of the National Post went further, calling it the worst movie ever made. The Village Voice summed up reviews of the film under the title "Me-Ouch". The movie was the winner of four Razzies for Worst Picture, Worst Actress, Worst Director (Pitof) and Worst Screenplay. Berry arrived at the ceremony to accept her Razzie in person (with her Best Actress Oscar for Monster's Ball in hand), saying: "First of all, I want to thank Warner Bros. Thank you for putting me in a piece of shit, god-awful movie ... It was just what my career needed." Roger Ebert included it in his "most hated" list, being joined by Screen Rant and Flavorwire, who also included it in their worst film lists.

 Daniel – Der Zauberer (Daniel – The Wizard) (2004) 

The German film Daniel – Der Zauberer was directed by Ulli Lommel and stars pop singer and ex-Deutschland sucht den Superstar contestant Daniel Küblböck, who appeared as a fictionalized version of himself.The Daily Dot wrote that it is considered to be the worst German film, while n-tv said it was "possibly the worst movie ever made". The website filmstarts.de states that Daniel – Der Zauberer was "unbearable for non-fans of Küblböck", adding that "the performances of the actors were some of the worst in the history of German cinema", and alleging that Ulli Lommel and producer Peter Schamoni had "damaged their reputation".

The film also performed extremely poorly at the box office, having only 13,834 viewers altogether, which led to it being withdrawn from screening at most cinemas within the first week, with RP Online referring to it as a "super-flop". It is consistently listed at IMDb's Bottom 100 list and became the lowest rated film at one point. Total Film listed it as the third worst film of all time, after Superbabies: Baby Geniuses 2 and the direct-to-video animated mockbuster Titanic: The Legend Goes On, and New York Daily News listed it among the seven worst films ever made. In an interview conducted several years after its release, Daniel Küblböck admitted that, in retrospect, "[Y]ou have to say this is the worst movie of all time really". Filmstarts.de ranked it number 4 in its list of the 25 worst movies ever made, and on the German movie rating site Moviepilot.de, it is the lowest-rated film with an average rating of 0.4/10.

 Superbabies: Baby Geniuses 2 (2004) 

The family-oriented comedy Superbabies: Baby Geniuses 2 was the last film directed by Bob Clark (of A Christmas Story fame) before his death. It is a sequel to the 1999 film Baby Geniuses and like its predecessor, it received negative reviews from film critics, becoming the 6th worst reviewed film of the decade on Rotten Tomatoes with a 0% rating. Following the plot of the first film, four babies can communicate with each other using 'baby talk', and have knowledge of many secrets. The "baby geniuses" become involved in a scheme by media mogul Bill Biscane (Jon Voight), a notorious kidnapper of children, who intends to use a satellite system to brainwash the world's population and force them to watch television for the rest of their lives.

The film was a box-office bomb, only receiving $9 million from its $20 million budget. Entertainment Weekly writer Joshua Rivera stated that it was the worst movie he had ever sat through, and Tom Long of The Deseret News said "It is perhaps the most incompetent and least funny comic film ever made." It was nominated for four Golden Raspberry Awards including Worst Picture, Worst Director (Bob Clark), Worst Supporting Actor (Jon Voight) and Worst Screenplay (Steven Paul (story) & Gregory Poppen). Total Film named it the runner-up to Titanic: The Legend Goes On in its list of the worst films ever made, and Mental Floss selected it as the second worst movie ever made after Ballistic: Ecks vs. Sever. It was ranked as the worst sequel of all time by Rotten Tomatoes.

 Alone in the Dark (2005) 

Loosely based on a series of video games by Infogrames and directed by Uwe Boll, the German-Canadian-American film Alone in the Dark was panned by critics for a multitude of reasons, including poor script and production values, quick cuts to optimize the gory content, almost no connection to the game, and bad acting. The movie received a 1% rating at Rotten Tomatoes, and was included in their Top 100 worst reviewed movies of the 2000s at number two. It appeared on Metacritic's list of the all-time lowest-scoring films, which they gave a 9/100 to, is on the MRQE's 50 Worst Movies list, and is one of the few films to have received an F rating on CinemaScore.

Roger Moore of The Orlando Sentinel stated: "Alone in the Dark shows just how tenuous Plan 9 from Outer Space's hold on that 'worst movie ever' title really is." Likewise, Peter Hartlaub, the San Francisco Chronicle pop culture critic, called the film "the best Ed Wood movie ever made ... a film so mind-blowingly horrible that it teeters on the edge of cinematic immortality". In 2009, he named it the worst film of the decade. Jeffrey Lyles of The Gazette considered it so bad that "other legendary bad films ... await a film of this magnitude because it gets awfully lonely on the island of misfit movies", while Scott Nash of Three Movie Buffs dubbed it "one of the worst movies ever made".

Screenwriter Blair Erickson wrote about his experience dealing with Boll and his original script, which was closer to the actual game itself, and Boll's script change demands on the comedy website Something Awful. It received two 2005 Golden Raspberry Awards nominations for Worst Director (Uwe Boll) and Worst Actress (Tara Reid), and won three 2005 Stinkers Awards, for Worst Picture, Worst Director, and Worst Special Effects. Empire, Flavorwire and Screen Rant all later included the film on their respective lists for the worst films ever made.

 Aag (2007) 

Aag is a remake of one of the most successful Bollywood films, Sholay, directed by Ram Gopal Varma. Rajeev Masand gave it a zero out of five. Times of India stated that Aag "destroyed Bollywood's greatest film" and acknowledged that some "consider it the world's worst film". Hindustan Times awarded it the "Lifetime's Worst Ever Movie Award". It came in first in a FHM India list of the 57 worst movies ever made. Total Film included it in their list of the 66 worst films of all time. Amitabh Bachchan, who appeared in the original film and returned for the remake, later admitted that the film was "a mistake".

 Epic Movie (2007) 

Epic Movie is a parody film by Jason Friedberg and Aaron Seltzer that mainly parodies epic and fantasy movies, most notably The Chronicles of Narnia: The Lion, the Witch and the Wardrobe and the Harry Potter films, but also contains references to all kinds of other then-popular films. Like most works of Friedberg and Seltzer, it received extremely negative reviews, holding an approval rating of 2% on Rotten Tomatoes, and a Metacritic score of 17/100, indicating "overwhelming dislike".

Harry Fletcher of the Standard said: "Filmmakers and trash-peddlers Jason Friedberg and Aaron Seltzer have been responsible for some of the most pointless, lazy and unforgivable movies of the past decade and frankly, they need to be stopped. Disaster Movie, 300 spoof Meet the Spartans and awful Hunger Games mickey-take The Starving Games could easily have made this list of the worst movies ever made, but Epic Movie might be the worst of the lot. It offers the most uninspired, unfunny film pastiches imaginable, sometimes repeating entire sections of dialogue verbatim from the movies they're supposedly satirising."

Nathan Rabin gave it an F score and said, "Epic Movie [...] strays so far from the solid fundamentals of filmmaking that it calls the very foundation of humor into question." Josh Rosenblatt of The Austin Chronicle said: "I’ve rarely seen a movie as hostile as this one, both to its audience and to its protagonists, and I don't think I realized before just how mean-spirited comedy can get (and I was raised on the Three Stooges)." Jamie Russell of the BBC called it "the most excruciating, unfunny film you'll see this year... if not your entire lifetime."

At the 28th Golden Raspberry Awards, it received three nominations, for Worst Remake or Rip-off, Worst Screenplay and Worst Supporting Actress (Carmen Electra). It is included in Empire's and Flavorwire's lists of the 50 worst movies ever made, Standard's list of the 12 worst films ever made, MRQE's 50 worst movies list and Newsweek's list of the 50 worst comedy movies of all time.

 I Know Who Killed Me (2007) 

I Know Who Killed Me is a psychological thriller film directed by Chris Sivertson and starring Lindsay Lohan as identical twins, one of whom insists her identity is that of another woman after being abducted by a serial killer. At the 28th Golden Raspberry Awards, it set a record for most awards won in a single year by winning eight awards and it received two further nominations at the 30th Golden Raspberry Awards.

The How Did This Get Made? podcast questioned, "Is this the worst movie Lindsay Lohan has ever been in or flat out the worst movie ever?" Richard Roeper selected the film as the worst of the 2000s. Gabe Delahaye of Stereogum reviewed I Know Who Killed Me as part of his search for the worst movie ever made, writing that: "Out of all the possible Worst Movies of All Time so far, none has been as painful to actually watch as I Know Who Killed Me". It was named the 34th worst movie ever made in Empires 50 Worst Movies Ever poll and After Ellen named it the second worst ever made, after Gigli. MRQE includes it on its 50 Worst Movies list, and it has a rare F rating on CinemaScore.

 Meet the Spartans (2008) 

Another 2008 parody movie by Jason Friedberg and Aaron Seltzer, Meet the Spartans mainly parodied the movie 300, but references to numerous other films as well. Like most Friedberg and Seltzer projects, it received extremely negative reviews, holding an approval rating of 2% on Rotten Tomatoes, with the consensus reading: "A tired, unfunny, offensive waste of time, Meet the Spartans scrapes the bottom of the cinematic barrel.", and a Metacritic score of 9/100, indicating "overwhelming dislike". Josh Levin of Slate called it the worst movie he had ever seen. It is included in Empire's and Flavorwire'''s lists of the 50 worst movies ever made, News.com.au's list of the 15 worst films of all time, Metacritic's list of the all-time lowest-scoring films and MRQE's 50 Worst Movies list. At the 29th Golden Raspberry Awards, it received five nominations, including Worst Picture.

 Disaster Movie (2008) Disaster Movie is a parody film written and directed by Jason Friedberg and Aaron Seltzer, spoofing films in the disaster film genre. The film, like most films by Friedberg and Seltzer, received extremely negative reviews, and has a 1% rating on Rotten Tomatoes based on 73 reviews. The site's consensus states: "Returning to their seemingly bottomless well of flatulence humor, racial stereotypes, and stale pop culture gags, Friedberg and Seltzer have produced what is arguably their worst Movie yet". It was ranked by Rotten Tomatoes as one of the worst reviewed films of the 2000s. Jason Solomons of The Guardian stated that "Nothing can convey the grimness of Disaster Movie, which would be the Worst Movie Ever Made were it actually a movie at all." Adam Tobias of Watertown Daily Times claimed that "I just don't see how anyone could not find Disaster Movie one of the worst films of all time." Tobias went on to write that the title was appropriate because the film is "a disaster". It was featured in Empire's 50 Worst Movies Ever poll, Total Film's 66 Worst Movies Ever list Metacritic's list of the all-time lowest-scoring films, and the MRQE's 50 Worst Movies list (where it holds a score of 17, the lowest score on the site). Disaster Movie received a rare F rating on CinemaScore. The film is also notable for being the motion picture debut of Kim Kardashian, whose performance garnered a nomination for Worst Supporting Actress at the 29th Golden Raspberry Awards alongside five additional nominations.

 The Hottie and the Nottie (2008) 

The romantic comedy The Hottie and the Nottie starring Paris Hilton, Joel Moore, Christine Lakin, and The Greg Wilson opened to poor box-office takings and strongly negative reviews with a 5% rating on Rotten Tomatoes. The British newspaper The People, reviewing The Hottie and the Nottie, claimed "Paris Hilton is the world's worst actress and she's starring in the worst movie ever made." Nathan Lee of The Village Voice called it "crass, shrill, disingenuous, tawdry, mean-spirited, vulgar, idiotic, boring, slapdash, half-assed, and very, very unfunny". Online film critic James Berardinelli described the film's comedy as "about as funny as the anal rape scene in The War Zone". Richard Roeper called it "excruciatingly, painfully, horribly, terribly awful", and argued that "nobody in this movie really should have a career in movies". Connie Ogle in the Miami Herald described The Hottie and the Nottie thus: "Imagine the worst movie you've ever seen. Got it? Now try to think of something worse. That something is this movie – wretched, embarrassing and a waste of the time and energy of everyone involved." The film appears on Metacritic's list of the all-time lowest-scoring films, and the MRQE's 50 Worst Movies list. The U.K. failure of the movie along with the U.S. failure of Doogal led to its UK distributor of the movie Pathé giving up UK distribution rights in 2009 and having Warner Bros. and 20th Century Fox distribute Pathe's films theatrically in the UK, with two of their films Chatroom and Dead Man Running being transferred to the now defunct Revolver Entertainment and The Illusionist in 2010 being their last standalone distributor film to date.

 Álom.net (2009) Álom.net (also known as Dream Well or Dream.net) is a Hungarian film which emulates tropes found in American teen films. 444.hu wrote that it is "the worst movie of all time, and that's why it became a cult film". Furthermore, 24.hu and Index.hu each named it the worst Hungarian film ever made. Total Film named it the fourth worst film ever made and FMC.hu included it on their list of the ten worst films ever made.

 2010s 

 Birdemic: Shock and Terror (2010) 

An independently produced film that is an apparent homage to Alfred Hitchcock's The Birds, Birdemic: Shock and Terror tells the story of a romance between the two leading characters, played by Alan Bagh and Whitney Moore, as their small town is attacked by birds (which do not appear until 47 minutes into the film). Written, directed, and produced by James Nguyen, it was intended as a "romantic thriller" but is notable due to its poor quality, with reviewers calling out its wooden acting, bad dialogue, amateurish sound and editing, nonsensical plot and, in particular, its special effects, consisting primarily of poorly rendered computer generated eagles and vultures that perform physically awkward aerial maneuvers and explode upon impact with the ground.

The film, which cost $10,000 to make, was called by the Huffington Post "truly, one of the worst films ever made" and by The Village Voice as "one more in the pantheon of beloved trash-terpieces". Flavorwire ranked it number 1 in its list of the 50 worst films ever made. Slate deemed it among the worst movies ever made, while Salon referred to it as "a cult hit among bad-movie fans" and Variety stated that the film displayed "all the revered hallmarks of hilariously bad filmmaking". Following the home media release of Birdemic, Michael J. Nelson, Kevin Murphy, and Bill Corbett of Mystery Science Theater 3000 fame produced an audio commentary track to accompany the movie through Rifftrax. They later riffed upon the film again theatrically. In response to the cult status of the first film, a sequel—Birdemic 2: The Resurrection—was released in 2013, and included many returning members of the cast and crew.

 The Last Airbender (2010) The Last Airbender is a fantasy/adventure film written, produced, and directed by M. Night Shyamalan and is based on the acclaimed Nickelodeon animated television series Avatar: The Last Airbender. Upon release, the film received extremely negative reviews, with critics panning the bad acting, numerous plot holes, screenplay, poor special effects (despite its reported $150 million budget), and especially Shyamalan's directing. It was also ridiculed for the poor quality of its post-converted 3-D, and the casting of white and Indian actors to portray characters who were East Asian or Inuit in the source material triggered accusations of racism and whitewashing. Further criticism came from fans of the original cartoon series, who said the film differed tremendously from its critically acclaimed source material. David Onda of Comcast wrote that it "has been called one of the worst ever made. The movie was universally panned by critics and failed to make back its production budget domestically." It garnered nine nominations at the 31st Golden Raspberry Awards, and won five, including Worst Picture and Worst Director. Roger Ebert wrote, "The Last Airbender is an agonizing experience in every category I can think of and others still waiting to be invented. The laws of chance suggest that something should have gone right. Not here. It puts a nail in the coffin of low-rent 3D, but it will need a lot more coffins than that." When asked if Last Airbender had been the worst film he has ever seen, Mike Ryan of Vanity Fair answered, "Yes". Hi highlighted the film in their "Worst Films Ever" series, and Screen Rant and Digital Trends included it in their worst film lists. Dev Patel would later express regret and dislike for his role and his experience with the film. He described his performance as Prince Zuko as being as though he “saw a stranger on the screen that I couldn't relate to.”

 Bucky Larson: Born to Be a Star (2011) Bucky Larson: Born to Be a Star was produced by Adam Sandler's Happy Madison Productions and featured Nick Swardson in the titular role as a small-town manchild who pursues a career in the pornographic film industry after learning that his parents were porn stars in the 1970s. On Rotten Tomatoes, Bucky Larson has a 3% rating, based on 36 reviews. Linda Cook of the Quad-City Times described the film as "the worst of the worst", while hollywoodchicago.com called it "one of the worst comedies of all time". Jim Vorel of Pastes Bad Movie Diaries column suggested that Bucky Larson was the worst film covered by the column. In listing it as one of the ten worst comedies ever, Michael Musto stated that Bucky Larson was "a badness the world had forgotten was capable of existing". Screen Rant included it in its list of the 25 worst movies in film history and Mental Floss named it the fifth worst movie ever. Bucky Larson also appears on MRQE's 50 Worst Movies list, and Metacritic's list of the all-time lowest-scoring films. The film earned six nominations at the 32nd Golden Raspberry Awards, but lost in every category to Jack and Jill, which was also produced by Happy Madison Productions.

Jack and Jill (2011) 

Jack and Jill is a comedy film starring Adam Sandler as Jack, a commercial director, who is visited by his "identical" twin sister, Jill (played by Sandler, in drag), during the holidays. Salon stated that Jack and Jill "received some of the worst reviews of any movie ever" upon its release. In the film, Jill is wooed by Al Pacino, whom Jack wants to be in his Dunkin' Donuts commercial. Richard Roeper of the Chicago Sun-Times noted the irony of Pacino's presence, as the actor is best known for playing Michael Corleone in The Godfather, which is widely considered one of the best films ever made, in this film, which he called "one of the worst movies in the history of cinema!" Ramin Setoodeh of The Daily Beast and Peter Travers of Rolling Stone reviewed it together in an article entitled "Adam Sandler's 'Jack and Jill' Is the Worst Movie Ever Made". After an hour-long critique, RedLetterMedia claimed that it was "so egregious that it ceased to be a film", and the site also later called it "the worst thing in the world". Mike McGranaghan wrote, on his website The Aisle Seat: "Howard the Duck, Gigli, Showgirls, From Justin to Kelly. What do they all have in common? They're all widely considered among the worst big studio movies ever made. You know what else they have in common? They're all better than Jack and Jill." Jack and Jill won a record 10 awards at the 32nd Golden Raspberry Awards, sweeping every category. It broke the record previously held by Battlefield Earth for having the most Razzies earned by a single film and is the only film to win every possible award. The film holds a 3% rating on Rotten Tomatoes based on 110 reviews. Vanity Fair and Screen Rant subsequently included it on their respective worst film lists.

That's My Boy (2012) 

Another comedy film starring Adam Sandler, That's My Boy concerns a middle school student named Donny Berger who has sex with his teacher, gets her pregnant, and in turn, earns a lifestyle of a minor celebrity, something he never intended to happen. Years later, Donny (played by Sandler) crashes his now-adult son's (Andy Samberg) wedding and bachelor party to get  money to pay his taxes, therefore avoiding prison. The film has been widely panned due to its comedic portrayal of incest, hebephilia, statutory rape, and gerontophilia, with film critic Andrew O'Hehir of Salon stating, "[Sandler's] new movie about a rape survivor and his estranged son is supposed to be funny, but radiates pain and rage." Richard Roeper of the Chicago Sun-Times proclaimed, "To say That's My Boy is one of the worst movies of the year is to insult 2012. This is one of the worst movies I've ever seen", while Richard Haridly of Quickflix called it "one of the saddest and most exhausting" films he has ever seen. MaryAnn Johanson of Flick Filosopher outright panned the film for its inability to generate laughs as well as its depraved content, calling it "a disgusting excuse for a comedy" and possibly "the most repulsive movie I've ever seen", and Jonathan Lack of We Got This Covered declared, "That's My Boy isn't just the worst film of 2012, it's one of the most morally reprehensible comedies of all time, a disgusting movie you should stay far, far away from." Furthermore, Ed Whitfield of The Ooh Tray stated, "It may be the worst film, in any genre, ever made". In addition to the movie's overwhelmingly negative reviews, That's My Boy earned eight nominations at the 33rd Golden Raspberry Awards, such as Worst Picture and Worst Director, and won the awards for Worst Actor (Sandler) and Worst Screenplay. It holds a 20% rating on Rotten Tomatoes  based on 115 reviews.

Foodfight! (2012) 

The animated comedy Foodfight! was directed by Larry Kasanoff and features a cast of celebrity voice actors, including Charlie Sheen, Wayne Brady, Hilary Duff, and Eva Longoria. The film revolves around brand mascots, known as "Ikes", who come to life in a supermarket after closing time, and their struggles against the forces of Brand X. Several actual corporate mascots make cameos in the movie, such as Mrs. Butterworth, Charlie the Tuna, and the California Raisins. Development for the movie began as early as 1999, but troubled production (including an incident where the hard drives had been stolen) and financial difficulties delayed its release several times. Upon the film's eventual theatrical release in 2012, it became a box-office bomb, earning just $74,000 against its reported $65 million budget. Foodfight! was also critically panned for its animation, humor, use of product placement as a central theme (and being aimed towards children), and content inappropriate for its target audience, such as sexual innuendo and references to Nazism. It subsequently garnered a reputation for being one of the worst films ever made.

A New York Times article condemned the film, saying: "The animation appears unfinished ... And the plot ... is impenetrable and even offensive." The article also reported that Foodfight! had been "seized upon by Internet purveyors of bad cinema". One such Internet critic was Nathan Rabin of The A.V. Club, who included the film in his My World of Flops column, describing it as "one of those fall-of-civilization moments" and "This is the kind of movie so unbelievably, surreally and exquisitely terrible that you want to share it with the rest of the world. I was put on earth to suffer through abominations like Foodfight! so that society as a whole might benefit from my Christ-like sacrifice." Meanwhile, a review in Esquire described it as "The Room, rendered in horribly sharp polygons" and Hollywood News called it "by far the crappiest piece of crap I have ever had the misfortune to watch". Likewise, critic Tim Brayton described it as "the absolute ugliest animated feature that has ever been released by something resembling an actual animation studio ... one of the very worst movies I have ever seen." Digital Trends, Mental Floss and MSN have since included Foodfight! in their worst film lists. Rebecca Hawkes of The Daily Telegraph described Foodfight! as "the worst animated children's film ever made", while IndieWire, Comic Book Resources and Screen Rant have each described it as being one of the worst animated films ever made.

Run for Your Wife (2012) 

A British comedy film based on the stage farce of the same name, Run for Your Wife starred Danny Dyer as John Smith, a bigamist, and Denise van Outen and Sarah Harding as his wives. Run for Your Wife was directed by the author of the play, Ray Cooney (who also makes an uncredited cameo appearance). Upon release, Run for Your Wife was savaged by film critics, with the South African newspaper Daily News saying "Run for Your Wife could be the worst film in history", the Studio Briefing website reporting that "Some writers are making the case that the British comedy may be 'the worst film ever, and The Daily Mirror claiming Run For Your Wife "was branded the worst British film ever". Run for Your Wife met with such overwhelmingly negative reviews upon release that the reviews themselves were widely reported in the UK media. The film was variously described as "a catastrophe", "as funny as leprosy" and "30 years past its sell-by-date", with The Guardian reviewer Peter Bradshaw saying that it "makes The Dick Emery Show look edgy and contemporary". The Independent's Anthony Quinn wrote, "The stage play ran for nine years – it [the film] will be lucky to run for nine days. Perhaps never in the field of light entertainment have so many actors sacrificed so much dignity in the cause of so few jokes ... From the look of it, Cooney hasn't been in a cinema for about 30 years".

The cast featured numerous British celebrities in cameo roles, which was commented upon by several reviewers. The Metro commented that "no one emerges unscathed among the cameo-packed cast that reads largely like a roll-call for Brit TV legends you'd previously suspected deceased". The Daily Record described the film as "an exasperating farce containing not one single, solitary laugh.  people losing their trousers and falling over, the film looks like a pilot for a (mercifully) never-commissioned 70s sitcom". An article in the Independent described Run for Your Wife (along with the similarly panned Movie 43) as contenders for the title of the "worst film in history". The Berkhamsted & Tring Gazette reported "critics have being queuing up to batter recent release Run for Your Wife, with general agreement that it ranks among the worst British comedies of all time". Run for Your Wife was also a box office bomb, earning only £602 in its opening weekend at the British box office to its £900,000 budget. Run for Your Wife has a 0% rating on Rotten Tomatoes  based on 15 reviews.

Movie 43 (2013) 

Produced and co-directed by Peter Farrelly among others, Movie 43 is a gross out sex comedy film consisting of several vignettes each by a different director and a sizable cast of recognizable actors and actresses including Dennis Quaid, Greg Kinnear, Hugh Jackman, Kate Winslet, Liev Schreiber, Naomi Watts, Anna Faris, Emma Stone, Richard Gere, Uma Thurman, Chloë Grace Moretz, Gerard Butler, Halle Berry, Stephen Merchant, Kristen Bell, Terrence Howard, Elizabeth Banks, Kate Bosworth, Johnny Knoxville, Justin Long, Chris Pratt, Josh Duhamel, and Jason Sudeikis. Several critics have called it one of the worst films ever made, including Peter Howell of the Toronto Star, who said, "There's just one use for Movie 43, apart from it being ground into the landfill that it deserves to become sooner rather than later. It provides me with a handy new answer to a question I'm often asked: 'What's the worst film you've ever seen? Elizabeth Weitzman of the New York Daily News also considered it the worst movie she ever saw. Brady Murphy of Murphy Reviews wrote, "A world where a film like this can exist only reminds me of the other contemptible acts performed by human kind since the dawn of time, and is rather eye-opening in that respect. That probably wasn't intentional, though"; he went on to say that "The idea that anyone could think that this would be in any way humorous is simply unbelievable." He concluded his review by saying the movie "had no heart" and gave it the site's first zero out of ten rating.

Richard Roeper of the Chicago Sun-Times voiced similar hatred, calling it "aggressively tasteless" and "the Citizen Kane of awful". Lou Lumenick of the New York Post stated, "If you mashed-up the worst parts of the infamous Howard the Duck, Gigli, Ishtar and every other awful movie I've seen since I started reviewing professionally in 1981, it wouldn't begin to approach the sheer soul-sucking badness of the cringe-inducing Movie 43." Movie 43 is on the MRQE's 50 Worst Movies list. It holds a 4% approval rating on Rotten Tomatoes based on 89 reviews, averaging out at a 2.7/10 rating. It won three awards at the 34th Golden Raspberry Awards: Worst Picture, Worst Director, and Worst Screenplay. In the Worst Director category, all 13 directors won the award.

Fateful Findings (2013) 

Fateful Findings is a 2013 independent techno-thriller written, directed and produced by Neil Breen. Breen also starred in the film and took on most of the crew roles, including film editor, sound editor, accountant, caterer, set designer, wardrobe, makeup and casting. The film follows an author-turned-hacker with supernatural powers who uses his abilities to reveal government and corporate secrets while struggling with his wife's drug addiction and the flirtations of his teenage neighbor, ending with an extended sequence at a press conference where politicians and business people confess to corruption and kill themselves before an applauding crowd. Writing for Film Threat, reviewer Mike Hodges described it as "the worst movie ever made", comparing it unfavorably to Troll 2 and The Room. Nathan Rabin, writing for Rotten Tomatoes, said Fateful Findings threatens The Rooms position as "best worst movie", while reviewers of the podcast The Flop House said "Move over The Room, move over Birdemic" and Mystery Science Theater 3000 head writer Elliott Kalan described it as the "good-est bad movie, maybe, I've ever seen". Screen Rant and the New York Daily News later listed it as one of the worst films of all time.

Humshakals (2014) 

A Bollywood comedy film directed by Sajid Khan, Humshakals featured Indian actors Saif Ali Khan, Ram Kapoor and Riteish Deshmukh. On Rotten Tomatoes, the film has a 0% rating, based on six reviews, with an average rating of 2/10. Mihir Fadnavis wrote in his Firstpost review, "sexual tomfoolery, shrieking and hamming aside, there's much more to hate about this 'family movie'. It's disturbing to see such an atrocious, regressive, misogynistic, sexist, homophobic cinematic product force-fed to paying audiences. I can understand that a comedy need not be 'safe', but what goes on in Humshakals is simply too horrifying to bear." Saurabh Dwivedi of India Today stated "I can only say that Humshakals will be listed in one of the worst films of the century." Writing in Emirates 24/7, Sneha May Francis said that it succeeded Khan's previous endeavor, Himmatwala, in becoming the worst Bollywood film ever. Fadnavis went further, writing that it displaced Himmatwala as the "worst possible product any film industry in the world can offer". Itrath Syed of The Georgia Straight stated that Humshakals was "the absolute bottom of the cinematic barrel". The film received five Golden Kela Award nominations, and won the “award” for Worst Film. It also won two Ghanta Awards; the film won Worst Picture and Ram Kapoor, Saif Ali Khan and Riteish Deshmukh shared the Worst Actor award.

Several of the cast members also lamented their involvement in the film. Despite being the film's leading actress, Bipasha Basu did not participate in the film's promotions because she was "extremely disturbed by the end result" and stated that "Humshakals was the worst experience of my life". Another cast member, actress Esha Gupta, warned her family to not watch the film. After the release of the film, leading actor Saif Ali Khan lamented that "I've been introspecting a lot and will never repeat a mistake that was Humshakals."

Saving Christmas (2014) 

Saving Christmas is a faith-based Christmas comedy film starring Kirk Cameron, who plays a fictionalized version of himself attempting to convince his brother-in-law (played by the film's director, Darren Doane) that Christmas is still a Christian holiday. On Rotten Tomatoes, the film has a 0% rating, based on 19 reviews, with an average rating of 2.40/10. Critic David Keyes described Saving Christmas as "The worst holiday movie ever made", Billings Gazette selected the film as the worst Christmas movie of all time, and Will Nicol of Digital Trends included it on his list of the ten worst movies ever made. Christy Lemire picked Saving Christmas as the worst film she has ever reviewed and called it "The Room of Christmas movies" (while adding that she found The Room to be more enjoyable) and gave it a score of zero stars out of four. Bill Zwecker of the Chicago Sun-Times said: "This may be one of the least artful holiday films ever made." In response to the criticism, Cameron asked fans to give the film positive reviews on Rotten Tomatoes. This resulted in a backlash in which Internet users traveled to the Rotten Tomatoes page and condemned the film. Three weeks after its release, Saving Christmas became the lowest-rated film on IMDb's bottom 100 list. Cameron blamed the low rating on a Reddit campaign by "haters and atheists" to purposely lower the film's ratings. The film won four awards, including Worst Picture, at the 35th Golden Raspberry Awards.

United Passions (2014) 

A 2014 English-language French drama film about the origins of the football world governing body Fédération Internationale de Football Association (FIFA), United Passions starred Tim Roth (as FIFA President Sepp Blatter), Gérard Depardieu and Sam Neill and was directed by Frédéric Auburtin. United Passions release in the U.S. occurred simultaneously with the 2015 FIFA corruption case, in which several current and former members of FIFA's executive committee were arrested on charges of corruption, and Blatter himself resigned following repeated accusations of corruption at FIFA under his leadership. United Passions was accused of ignoring these long-running claims. London Evening Standards Des Kelly wrote that United Passions was "the worst movie ever made" and "the most extraordinary vanity exercise; a vile, self-aggrandizing, sugar-coated pile of manure". Sean Mahoney of Inquisitr called it the "worst movie ever". Daniel Gold of The New York Times claimed United Passions is "one of the most unwatchable films in recent memory, a dishonest bit of corporate-suite sanitizing that's no good even for laughs", later stating it would make the top three of his list of all time bad films. Several critics noted the irony of the film's depiction of Blatter as an anti-corruption campaigner. Paul Field of the Daily Mirror said that this created "unintentional comedy gold", while Sara Stewart of the New York Post described it as "hilariously ill-timed". On Rotten Tomatoes, United Passions has an approval rating of 0% based on 16 reviews, while on Metacritic, the film holds a score of 1 out of 100, based on 9 critics, and is tied for the lowest scoring film on the site. Screen Rant subsequently included it on its list of the 25 worst movies of all time.

United Passions was also a box-office bomb, becoming the lowest-grossing film ever in American history, with a total take of $918, which surpassed the previous record held by I Kissed a Vampire ($1,380) in 2012. The film additionally went directly to DVD in France and was not distributed in a number of other European countries. Several of the people involved in United Passions later expressed regret over the film. Director Auburtin called United Passions "a disaster" and added: "Now I'm seen as bad as the guy who brought AIDS to Africa or the guy who caused the financial crisis ... apparently I am a propaganda guy making films for corrupt people." Tim Roth apologized for taking part in the film and admitted that he took the job in United Passions for the money. It also received the first Barry L. Bumstead Award during the 36th Golden Raspberry Awards, a special category for critical and financial failures that were not given an eligible release.

Dirty Grandpa (2016)

Dirty Grandpa, a 2016 comedy film starring Robert De Niro and Zac Efron as a grandfather and grandson going to Florida during spring break, received negative reviews for its gross-out and shock humor that was also considered as sexist, homophobic and racist. Mike Ryan of Uproxx said: "Dirty Grandpa is the worst movie I’ve ever seen in a movie theater. Burn it." He later also picked it as the worst film he had ever both reviewed and seen. Pete Hammond of Deadline Hollywood said: "... Dirty Grandpa, is not just the worst movie [De Niro] has ever been in, but it may be the worst movie anyone has ever been in." Glenn McDonald of Indy Week said: "The awful, ugly Dirty Grandpa is the comedy equivalent of torture porn ... In fact, in the dizzying moments after being bludgeoned by this miserable specimen, I was convinced it's among the worst movies ever made." Richard Roeper gave the film zero stars, writing, "If Dirty Grandpa isn't the worst movie of 2016, I have some serious cinematic torture in my near future." On his YouTube channel, Roeper also said: "I'm not ready to say Dirty Grandpa is the worst movie I've ever seen, but I'm also not ready to say it's not the worst movie I've ever seen." Mark Kermode, on his BBC Radio 5 Live show (Kermode and Mayo's Film Review), said that he found the film "truly, genuinely horrible" and went on to say, "after Dirty Grandpa I did feel genuinely unclean, I wanted to go and have a shower, because it's just so revolting. Somewhere in hell there is a multiplex playing this on a double bill, with Movie 43 and Entourage." He would later go on to brand it his least favorite film of 2016.

Glenn Kenny of RogerEbert.com said: "The actor Bela Lugosi appeared in some landmark, perhaps even great, films at the beginning of his Hollywood career in the 1930s. ... Lugosi's final film was 1957's Plan 9 from Outer Space, frequently cited as the worst film ever made. The cinematic landmarks of De Niro's career include films such as Coppola's The Godfather Part II and Scorsese's Raging Bull. He has been featured in a good number of very bad films in the years since. But this? This might just be his own Plan 9". The film has an approval rating of 11% at Rotten Tomatoes based on 138 reviews, with an average rating of 3.1/10, while on Metacritic it has a score of 21 out of 100 based on 27 critics, indicating "generally unfavorable reviews". At the 37th Golden Raspberry Awards it received five nominations, for Worst Picture, Worst Actor (De Niro), Worst Screenplay, and two nominations for Worst Supporting Actress (Julianne Hough and Aubrey Plaza), but did not win in any category.

Guardians (2017) 

Guardians is a 2017 Russian superhero film about a team of Soviet superheroes created during the Cold War. It was criticized for having a derivative plot, bad acting and direction, cheap CGI, plot holes and overall low quality. Kg-portal.ru wrote that "Guardians is a film from which Russian cinema should be protected. It's like a sequel to Plan 9 from Outer Space, filmed by Uwe Boll, with the screenplay by Tommy Wiseau and with him in the lead role". Rossiyskaya Gazeta commented that the film was "Worse than you can imagine." Meduza compared the film's director, Sarik Andreasyan, to Plan 9 from Outer Spaces director, Ed Wood, and said that Guardians "is a convincing answer to the eternal question of why we can never catch up with Hollywood even in our own box office". Afisha said that it was the Russian answer to Howard the Duck, and Ivi, Inc. commented that "a more talentless film is hard to imagine". RIA Novosti placed it at the top of their worst film list, and it appears on Kritikanstvo's all-time lowest-scoring films. Critics outside of Russia generally panned the film but were not as harsh, as it has a 33% rating on Rotten Tomatoes based on 12 reviews. A sequel was planned, but the film was a box-office bomb, which resulted in the film's production company, Enjoy Movies, subsequently filing for bankruptcy, and the Cinema Foundation of Russia, which provided part of the budget, suing the company and demanding a return of the investment.

Loqueesha (2019)

The 2019 comedy film Loqueesha stars Jeremy Saville, who also independently wrote, directed, and produced the film, as Joe, who needs money to pay for his son's private school education and, after getting rejected for a job as a radio host, the listing for which encourages women and minorities to apply, gets the job by pretending to be a sassy black woman named Loqueesha who gives out advice on air. The film's trailer and poster were panned online as racist and stereotypical upon their release, with Entertainment.ies Brian Lloyd writing that it was "one the [sic] worst fucking things we have ever seen, and we still can't believe it's actually real". Upon seeing the actual film, Nathan Rabin said that the film was "somehow much worse" than the trailer led people to believe.

The film received universally negative reception from critics, as it garnered a 0% rating on Rotten Tomatoes. Joel Golby of The Guardian called the plot "one of the more offensive in history", also criticizing its lighting, sound design, and acting, among other aspects of the film, and writing, "The worst film ever made. Worse than The Room, in every way. The one-star rating it currently has on IMDb is actively generous. I cannot believe this film got made." Dan Kahan of Popdust called it "genuinely the worst movie [he had] ever watched", calling Saville an "unbelievable racist" and deeming the movie "grotesque", "abhorrent", and "criminal". For Decider, Kay-B wrote that she "wouldn't recommend this film to anyone, living or dead" as it was "painfully hard to watch" while also dubbing it "the year's most reviled movie".

Cats (2019)

Cats is an American film adaptation of the popular musical penned by Andrew Lloyd Webber (based on the works of T. S. Eliot) and directed by Academy Award-winning filmmaker Tom Hooper (The King's Speech). The film is about a tribe of cats called the Jellicles as they hold their Jellicle Ball, an annual ceremony where the cats compete for the chance to enter the Heaviside Layer, where the chosen Jellicle will be granted a new life as a god.

Lloyd Webber condemned the film as "ridiculous" stating, "The problem with the film was that Tom Hooper decided that he didn't want anybody involved in it who was involved in the original show."
It was criticized for CGI "digital fur technology", which turned the film's actors into bipedal cats. An updated version of the film, with a refined CGI patch, was sent to theaters after its premiere. Critics also panned the performances of some of the actors, with James Corden and Rebel Wilson (who parodied themselves at the 92nd Academy Awards) receiving the most criticism. , Cats sits at a 19% on Rotten Tomatoes. The film won six Golden Raspberry Awards out of 9 nominations, including Worst Director for Hooper, Worst Supporting Actress for Wilson, Worst Supporting Actor for Corden, and Worst Picture overall.

Early reviews for Cats were embargoed. Manohla Dargis from The New York Times commented that "[a] doctoral thesis could be written about how this misfire sputtered into existence". British newspaper The Daily Telegraph called the film an "all-time disaster" with reviewer Tom Robey giving the film "zero stars" in his review. Critics from The Washington Post, Rolling Stone and The Detroit News wrote that it was a candidate for the worst film of the 2010s, with The Detroit News reviewer Adam Graham writing: "Cats is the biggest disaster of the decade, and possibly thus far in the millennium. It's Battlefield Earth with whiskers." Wade Major of CineGods.com slammed it as "Showgirls with fur", while Battlefield Earth screenwriter J. David Shapiro (who previously won the Razzie for Worst Screenplay) said Cats had usurped his film as the worst ever made.

2020s

365 Days (2020) 

365 Days (Polish: 365 Dni) is a 2020 Polish erotic romantic drama film directed by Barbara Białowąs and Tomasz Mandes. It is based on the first novel of a trilogy by Blanka Lipińska. The plot follows a young woman from Warsaw in a spiritless relationship falling for a dominant Sicilian man, who imprisons and imposes on her a period of 365 days for which to fall in love with him. It stars Michele Morrone as Don Massimo Torricelli and Anna-Maria Sieklucka as Laura Biel. The film was released theatrically in Poland on February 7, 2020, and was later made available on Netflix on June 7, 2020, where, despite extremely negative critical response, it became one of the most watched films, for a time being the fourth most-watched thing on Netflix UK and the third most-watched on Netflix US, and gained global attention. It was also a box-office success at Polish cinemas, grossing an estimated $8,964,000. The film received overwhelmingly negative reviews from critics, who heavily criticized its softcore themes, sexual violence and Mafia glorification. Rotten Tomatoes collected 16 reviews and identified 0% of them as positive, with an average rating of 1.9/10. Polish English-language news website The First News says that it has been dubbed one of the worst films ever. Taylor Andrews of Cosmopolitan called it the worst thing he had ever seen. Kevin Maher of The Times said "There haven't been line readings this poor since the third act of The Room" and "It makes the bonking puppets in Team America: World Police look like straight-faced documentary". Maddy Mussen of The Tab called it "the worst thing Netflix has ever produced" and said "If you have watched 365 Days on Netflix, there will not be a doubt in your mind that it's the worst thing you've ever seen." Jessica Kiang of Variety called it "a thoroughly terrible, politically objectionable, occasionally hilarious Polish humpathon".

In March 2021, the film was nominated for six Golden Raspberry Awards, for Worst Picture, Worst Director, Worst Actor (Michele Morrone), Worst Actress (Anna-Maria Sieklucka), Worst Screenplay and Worst Prequel, Remake, Rip-off or Sequel, becoming the second foreign-language film to be nominated for Worst Picture after Italy's Pinocchio (2002; albeit the dubbed version), and won only one for Worst Screenplay.

See also 

 List of films considered the best
 Box-office bomb
 List of box-office bombs
 List of films with a 0% rating on Rotten Tomatoes
 CinemaScore § List of "F" films
 The Incredibly Strange Film Show
 Z movie

References

Works cited

External links 
 Rotten Tomatoes: 100 Worst Movies of All Time
 Ebert's Most Hated

Worst
Films
Film and video fandom
Articles containing video clips